

467001–467100 

|-bgcolor=#E9E9E9
| 467001 ||  || — || November 24, 2006 || Kitt Peak || Spacewatch || — || align=right | 1.6 km || 
|-id=002 bgcolor=#d6d6d6
| 467002 ||  || — || January 15, 2005 || Kitt Peak || Spacewatch || EOS || align=right | 2.1 km || 
|-id=003 bgcolor=#E9E9E9
| 467003 ||  || — || October 19, 2010 || Mount Lemmon || Mount Lemmon Survey || — || align=right | 1.3 km || 
|-id=004 bgcolor=#E9E9E9
| 467004 ||  || — || February 6, 2007 || Mount Lemmon || Mount Lemmon Survey || — || align=right | 1.3 km || 
|-id=005 bgcolor=#E9E9E9
| 467005 ||  || — || October 16, 2006 || Mount Lemmon || Mount Lemmon Survey || — || align=right data-sort-value="0.70" | 700 m || 
|-id=006 bgcolor=#E9E9E9
| 467006 ||  || — || October 25, 2005 || Kitt Peak || Spacewatch || — || align=right | 2.2 km || 
|-id=007 bgcolor=#d6d6d6
| 467007 ||  || — || March 3, 2005 || Catalina || CSS || — || align=right | 4.3 km || 
|-id=008 bgcolor=#E9E9E9
| 467008 ||  || — || August 28, 2009 || Kitt Peak || Spacewatch || — || align=right | 1.5 km || 
|-id=009 bgcolor=#E9E9E9
| 467009 ||  || — || March 10, 2007 || Mount Lemmon || Mount Lemmon Survey || — || align=right | 2.0 km || 
|-id=010 bgcolor=#d6d6d6
| 467010 ||  || — || October 25, 2009 || Mount Lemmon || Mount Lemmon Survey || — || align=right | 2.7 km || 
|-id=011 bgcolor=#d6d6d6
| 467011 ||  || — || September 10, 2007 || Kitt Peak || Spacewatch || VER || align=right | 3.3 km || 
|-id=012 bgcolor=#d6d6d6
| 467012 ||  || — || March 29, 2011 || Mount Lemmon || Mount Lemmon Survey || — || align=right | 2.1 km || 
|-id=013 bgcolor=#E9E9E9
| 467013 ||  || — || December 25, 2010 || Mount Lemmon || Mount Lemmon Survey || — || align=right | 1.8 km || 
|-id=014 bgcolor=#E9E9E9
| 467014 ||  || — || May 27, 2003 || Kitt Peak || Spacewatch || — || align=right | 2.1 km || 
|-id=015 bgcolor=#fefefe
| 467015 ||  || — || April 7, 2005 || Kitt Peak || Spacewatch || — || align=right data-sort-value="0.88" | 880 m || 
|-id=016 bgcolor=#d6d6d6
| 467016 ||  || — || January 15, 2005 || Anderson Mesa || LONEOS || — || align=right | 3.0 km || 
|-id=017 bgcolor=#d6d6d6
| 467017 ||  || — || January 19, 2005 || Kitt Peak || Spacewatch || — || align=right | 3.3 km || 
|-id=018 bgcolor=#d6d6d6
| 467018 ||  || — || January 8, 2010 || Kitt Peak || Spacewatch || — || align=right | 2.9 km || 
|-id=019 bgcolor=#E9E9E9
| 467019 ||  || — || January 8, 2007 || Mount Lemmon || Mount Lemmon Survey || — || align=right | 1.4 km || 
|-id=020 bgcolor=#d6d6d6
| 467020 ||  || — || April 21, 2006 || Kitt Peak || Spacewatch || — || align=right | 2.5 km || 
|-id=021 bgcolor=#E9E9E9
| 467021 ||  || — || April 22, 2004 || Kitt Peak || Spacewatch || — || align=right | 1.1 km || 
|-id=022 bgcolor=#d6d6d6
| 467022 ||  || — || January 18, 2005 || Kitt Peak || Spacewatch || — || align=right | 2.7 km || 
|-id=023 bgcolor=#fefefe
| 467023 ||  || — || September 11, 2007 || Mount Lemmon || Mount Lemmon Survey || — || align=right data-sort-value="0.73" | 730 m || 
|-id=024 bgcolor=#fefefe
| 467024 ||  || — || March 10, 2005 || Mount Lemmon || Mount Lemmon Survey || NYS || align=right data-sort-value="0.84" | 840 m || 
|-id=025 bgcolor=#d6d6d6
| 467025 ||  || — || April 20, 2012 || Kitt Peak || Spacewatch || — || align=right | 2.7 km || 
|-id=026 bgcolor=#E9E9E9
| 467026 ||  || — || September 3, 2010 || Mount Lemmon || Mount Lemmon Survey || EUN || align=right data-sort-value="0.89" | 890 m || 
|-id=027 bgcolor=#E9E9E9
| 467027 ||  || — || December 28, 2005 || Kitt Peak || Spacewatch || critical || align=right | 1.5 km || 
|-id=028 bgcolor=#E9E9E9
| 467028 ||  || — || January 28, 2011 || Mount Lemmon || Mount Lemmon Survey || — || align=right | 2.2 km || 
|-id=029 bgcolor=#E9E9E9
| 467029 ||  || — || April 1, 2012 || Mount Lemmon || Mount Lemmon Survey || EUN || align=right | 1.1 km || 
|-id=030 bgcolor=#E9E9E9
| 467030 ||  || — || March 8, 2008 || Kitt Peak || Spacewatch || — || align=right data-sort-value="0.94" | 940 m || 
|-id=031 bgcolor=#E9E9E9
| 467031 ||  || — || November 3, 2010 || Mount Lemmon || Mount Lemmon Survey || — || align=right data-sort-value="0.84" | 840 m || 
|-id=032 bgcolor=#d6d6d6
| 467032 ||  || — || February 1, 2005 || Kitt Peak || Spacewatch || — || align=right | 3.9 km || 
|-id=033 bgcolor=#E9E9E9
| 467033 ||  || — || April 14, 2008 || Mount Lemmon || Mount Lemmon Survey || — || align=right | 1.3 km || 
|-id=034 bgcolor=#fefefe
| 467034 ||  || — || March 18, 2005 || Catalina || CSS || — || align=right | 1.0 km || 
|-id=035 bgcolor=#d6d6d6
| 467035 ||  || — || August 22, 2007 || Kitt Peak || Spacewatch || — || align=right | 3.7 km || 
|-id=036 bgcolor=#d6d6d6
| 467036 ||  || — || March 8, 2005 || Kitt Peak || Spacewatch || URS || align=right | 3.5 km || 
|-id=037 bgcolor=#E9E9E9
| 467037 ||  || — || April 4, 2008 || Kitt Peak || Spacewatch || — || align=right | 1.2 km || 
|-id=038 bgcolor=#fefefe
| 467038 ||  || — || March 16, 2001 || Kitt Peak || Spacewatch || MAS || align=right data-sort-value="0.80" | 800 m || 
|-id=039 bgcolor=#d6d6d6
| 467039 ||  || — || January 30, 2006 || Kitt Peak || Spacewatch || — || align=right | 2.5 km || 
|-id=040 bgcolor=#d6d6d6
| 467040 ||  || — || May 31, 2006 || Kitt Peak || Spacewatch || VER || align=right | 3.1 km || 
|-id=041 bgcolor=#E9E9E9
| 467041 ||  || — || October 1, 2005 || Kitt Peak || Spacewatch || AEO || align=right data-sort-value="0.97" | 970 m || 
|-id=042 bgcolor=#d6d6d6
| 467042 ||  || — || January 23, 2006 || Kitt Peak || Spacewatch || — || align=right | 2.4 km || 
|-id=043 bgcolor=#d6d6d6
| 467043 ||  || — || April 5, 2011 || Catalina || CSS || — || align=right | 2.7 km || 
|-id=044 bgcolor=#fefefe
| 467044 ||  || — || December 9, 2012 || Catalina || CSS || H || align=right data-sort-value="0.64" | 640 m || 
|-id=045 bgcolor=#d6d6d6
| 467045 ||  || — || March 8, 2005 || Kitt Peak || Spacewatch || — || align=right | 4.8 km || 
|-id=046 bgcolor=#d6d6d6
| 467046 ||  || — || January 17, 2005 || Kitt Peak || Spacewatch || — || align=right | 3.0 km || 
|-id=047 bgcolor=#E9E9E9
| 467047 ||  || — || February 25, 2011 || Mount Lemmon || Mount Lemmon Survey || — || align=right | 1.8 km || 
|-id=048 bgcolor=#d6d6d6
| 467048 ||  || — || September 28, 2003 || Kitt Peak || Spacewatch || BRA || align=right | 1.5 km || 
|-id=049 bgcolor=#fefefe
| 467049 ||  || — || December 16, 2007 || Mount Lemmon || Mount Lemmon Survey || — || align=right | 1.0 km || 
|-id=050 bgcolor=#E9E9E9
| 467050 ||  || — || February 10, 2007 || Mount Lemmon || Mount Lemmon Survey || — || align=right | 2.1 km || 
|-id=051 bgcolor=#d6d6d6
| 467051 ||  || — || July 18, 2007 || Mount Lemmon || Mount Lemmon Survey || EOS || align=right | 2.3 km || 
|-id=052 bgcolor=#E9E9E9
| 467052 ||  || — || March 26, 2003 || Campo Imperatore || CINEOS || — || align=right | 2.9 km || 
|-id=053 bgcolor=#d6d6d6
| 467053 ||  || — || February 10, 1999 || Kitt Peak || Spacewatch || — || align=right | 2.9 km || 
|-id=054 bgcolor=#E9E9E9
| 467054 ||  || — || October 9, 2010 || Catalina || CSS || — || align=right | 1.4 km || 
|-id=055 bgcolor=#E9E9E9
| 467055 ||  || — || January 10, 1999 || Kitt Peak || Spacewatch || — || align=right | 2.0 km || 
|-id=056 bgcolor=#fefefe
| 467056 ||  || — || January 29, 2009 || Mount Lemmon || Mount Lemmon Survey || — || align=right data-sort-value="0.91" | 910 m || 
|-id=057 bgcolor=#fefefe
| 467057 ||  || — || October 5, 1999 || Kitt Peak || Spacewatch || — || align=right | 1.0 km || 
|-id=058 bgcolor=#E9E9E9
| 467058 ||  || — || December 2, 2005 || Kitt Peak || Spacewatch || AGN || align=right | 1.3 km || 
|-id=059 bgcolor=#fefefe
| 467059 ||  || — || February 4, 2009 || Mount Lemmon || Mount Lemmon Survey || — || align=right data-sort-value="0.62" | 620 m || 
|-id=060 bgcolor=#d6d6d6
| 467060 ||  || — || April 16, 2010 || WISE || WISE || — || align=right | 3.6 km || 
|-id=061 bgcolor=#d6d6d6
| 467061 ||  || — || January 15, 2005 || Kitt Peak || Spacewatch || EOS || align=right | 1.6 km || 
|-id=062 bgcolor=#d6d6d6
| 467062 ||  || — || April 22, 2007 || Mount Lemmon || Mount Lemmon Survey || — || align=right | 2.4 km || 
|-id=063 bgcolor=#E9E9E9
| 467063 ||  || — || August 25, 2000 || Socorro || LINEAR || — || align=right | 2.0 km || 
|-id=064 bgcolor=#fefefe
| 467064 ||  || — || December 19, 2003 || Kitt Peak || Spacewatch || — || align=right data-sort-value="0.79" | 790 m || 
|-id=065 bgcolor=#d6d6d6
| 467065 ||  || — || March 11, 2005 || Mount Lemmon || Mount Lemmon Survey || EOS || align=right | 2.4 km || 
|-id=066 bgcolor=#fefefe
| 467066 ||  || — || March 19, 2009 || Catalina || CSS || — || align=right data-sort-value="0.81" | 810 m || 
|-id=067 bgcolor=#E9E9E9
| 467067 ||  || — || April 5, 2003 || Kitt Peak || Spacewatch || — || align=right | 1.3 km || 
|-id=068 bgcolor=#E9E9E9
| 467068 ||  || — || October 6, 2005 || Mount Lemmon || Mount Lemmon Survey || — || align=right | 1.3 km || 
|-id=069 bgcolor=#fefefe
| 467069 ||  || — || March 11, 2005 || Mount Lemmon || Mount Lemmon Survey || — || align=right data-sort-value="0.71" | 710 m || 
|-id=070 bgcolor=#E9E9E9
| 467070 ||  || — || November 8, 2010 || Kitt Peak || Spacewatch || (5) || align=right data-sort-value="0.85" | 850 m || 
|-id=071 bgcolor=#E9E9E9
| 467071 ||  || — || March 1, 2008 || Kitt Peak || Spacewatch || — || align=right data-sort-value="0.72" | 720 m || 
|-id=072 bgcolor=#E9E9E9
| 467072 ||  || — || January 24, 2007 || Mount Lemmon || Mount Lemmon Survey || — || align=right | 1.5 km || 
|-id=073 bgcolor=#fefefe
| 467073 ||  || — || March 12, 2005 || Kitt Peak || Spacewatch || — || align=right data-sort-value="0.79" | 790 m || 
|-id=074 bgcolor=#E9E9E9
| 467074 ||  || — || January 25, 2011 || Kitt Peak || Spacewatch || — || align=right | 2.3 km || 
|-id=075 bgcolor=#fefefe
| 467075 ||  || — || January 16, 2005 || Kitt Peak || Spacewatch || — || align=right data-sort-value="0.80" | 800 m || 
|-id=076 bgcolor=#fefefe
| 467076 ||  || — || October 30, 2007 || Kitt Peak || Spacewatch || — || align=right data-sort-value="0.74" | 740 m || 
|-id=077 bgcolor=#fefefe
| 467077 ||  || — || March 3, 2000 || Socorro || LINEAR || H || align=right data-sort-value="0.80" | 800 m || 
|-id=078 bgcolor=#d6d6d6
| 467078 ||  || — || May 2, 2006 || Mount Lemmon || Mount Lemmon Survey || — || align=right | 3.0 km || 
|-id=079 bgcolor=#fefefe
| 467079 ||  || — || November 9, 2007 || Kitt Peak || Spacewatch || — || align=right data-sort-value="0.87" | 870 m || 
|-id=080 bgcolor=#d6d6d6
| 467080 ||  || — || October 23, 2008 || Mount Lemmon || Mount Lemmon Survey || THM || align=right | 2.3 km || 
|-id=081 bgcolor=#fefefe
| 467081 ||  || — || December 30, 2008 || Mount Lemmon || Mount Lemmon Survey || (2076) || align=right data-sort-value="0.68" | 680 m || 
|-id=082 bgcolor=#fefefe
| 467082 ||  || — || December 29, 2005 || Mount Lemmon || Mount Lemmon Survey || — || align=right data-sort-value="0.69" | 690 m || 
|-id=083 bgcolor=#fefefe
| 467083 ||  || — || September 15, 2007 || Kitt Peak || Spacewatch || — || align=right data-sort-value="0.63" | 630 m || 
|-id=084 bgcolor=#fefefe
| 467084 ||  || — || November 18, 2011 || Kitt Peak || Spacewatch || — || align=right data-sort-value="0.75" | 750 m || 
|-id=085 bgcolor=#E9E9E9
| 467085 ||  || — || September 17, 2009 || Mount Lemmon || Mount Lemmon Survey || — || align=right | 2.2 km || 
|-id=086 bgcolor=#d6d6d6
| 467086 ||  || — || March 10, 2005 || Mount Lemmon || Mount Lemmon Survey || — || align=right | 2.8 km || 
|-id=087 bgcolor=#d6d6d6
| 467087 ||  || — || March 11, 2005 || Mount Lemmon || Mount Lemmon Survey || HYG || align=right | 2.3 km || 
|-id=088 bgcolor=#fefefe
| 467088 ||  || — || February 2, 2008 || Catalina || CSS || H || align=right data-sort-value="0.61" | 610 m || 
|-id=089 bgcolor=#fefefe
| 467089 ||  || — || October 8, 2007 || Kitt Peak || Spacewatch || — || align=right data-sort-value="0.78" | 780 m || 
|-id=090 bgcolor=#fefefe
| 467090 ||  || — || March 31, 2009 || Kitt Peak || Spacewatch || — || align=right data-sort-value="0.80" | 800 m || 
|-id=091 bgcolor=#fefefe
| 467091 ||  || — || November 9, 2007 || Kitt Peak || Spacewatch || — || align=right data-sort-value="0.64" | 640 m || 
|-id=092 bgcolor=#fefefe
| 467092 ||  || — || December 2, 2004 || Kitt Peak || Spacewatch || — || align=right data-sort-value="0.67" | 670 m || 
|-id=093 bgcolor=#E9E9E9
| 467093 ||  || — || October 13, 2010 || Mount Lemmon || Mount Lemmon Survey || — || align=right | 1.3 km || 
|-id=094 bgcolor=#E9E9E9
| 467094 ||  || — || January 4, 2011 || Mount Lemmon || Mount Lemmon Survey || — || align=right | 1.8 km || 
|-id=095 bgcolor=#E9E9E9
| 467095 ||  || — || November 16, 2006 || Catalina || CSS || MAR || align=right | 1.2 km || 
|-id=096 bgcolor=#E9E9E9
| 467096 ||  || — || December 8, 2010 || Kitt Peak || Spacewatch || — || align=right | 2.0 km || 
|-id=097 bgcolor=#fefefe
| 467097 ||  || — || November 14, 2006 || Mount Lemmon || Mount Lemmon Survey || — || align=right | 1.2 km || 
|-id=098 bgcolor=#E9E9E9
| 467098 ||  || — || December 13, 2010 || Mount Lemmon || Mount Lemmon Survey || ADE || align=right | 2.2 km || 
|-id=099 bgcolor=#fefefe
| 467099 ||  || — || October 31, 2010 || Mount Lemmon || Mount Lemmon Survey || — || align=right | 1.1 km || 
|-id=100 bgcolor=#d6d6d6
| 467100 ||  || — || November 21, 2009 || Mount Lemmon || Mount Lemmon Survey || — || align=right | 4.4 km || 
|}

467101–467200 

|-bgcolor=#E9E9E9
| 467101 ||  || — || October 21, 2006 || Mount Lemmon || Mount Lemmon Survey || — || align=right | 1.6 km || 
|-id=102 bgcolor=#fefefe
| 467102 ||  || — || September 20, 2006 || Catalina || CSS || H || align=right data-sort-value="0.81" | 810 m || 
|-id=103 bgcolor=#d6d6d6
| 467103 ||  || — || June 1, 2010 || WISE || WISE || Tj (2.99) || align=right | 3.3 km || 
|-id=104 bgcolor=#E9E9E9
| 467104 ||  || — || March 24, 1998 || Kitt Peak || Spacewatch || JUN || align=right | 1.1 km || 
|-id=105 bgcolor=#E9E9E9
| 467105 ||  || — || October 1, 2005 || Kitt Peak || Spacewatch || — || align=right | 1.6 km || 
|-id=106 bgcolor=#E9E9E9
| 467106 ||  || — || March 13, 2007 || Kitt Peak || Spacewatch || — || align=right | 2.0 km || 
|-id=107 bgcolor=#E9E9E9
| 467107 ||  || — || March 15, 2012 || Kitt Peak || Spacewatch || — || align=right data-sort-value="0.95" | 950 m || 
|-id=108 bgcolor=#d6d6d6
| 467108 ||  || — || February 25, 2006 || Mount Lemmon || Mount Lemmon Survey || — || align=right | 2.6 km || 
|-id=109 bgcolor=#fefefe
| 467109 ||  || — || February 4, 2005 || Mount Lemmon || Mount Lemmon Survey || — || align=right data-sort-value="0.69" | 690 m || 
|-id=110 bgcolor=#d6d6d6
| 467110 ||  || — || September 17, 2012 || Mount Lemmon || Mount Lemmon Survey || — || align=right | 3.8 km || 
|-id=111 bgcolor=#d6d6d6
| 467111 ||  || — || November 16, 2003 || Kitt Peak || Spacewatch || — || align=right | 3.0 km || 
|-id=112 bgcolor=#d6d6d6
| 467112 ||  || — || September 24, 2008 || Mount Lemmon || Mount Lemmon Survey || EOS || align=right | 3.4 km || 
|-id=113 bgcolor=#fefefe
| 467113 ||  || — || February 1, 2005 || Kitt Peak || Spacewatch || — || align=right data-sort-value="0.80" | 800 m || 
|-id=114 bgcolor=#E9E9E9
| 467114 ||  || — || February 12, 2008 || Mount Lemmon || Mount Lemmon Survey || — || align=right | 1.8 km || 
|-id=115 bgcolor=#d6d6d6
| 467115 ||  || — || February 24, 2006 || Kitt Peak || Spacewatch || EOS || align=right | 1.3 km || 
|-id=116 bgcolor=#d6d6d6
| 467116 ||  || — || October 26, 2008 || Kitt Peak || Spacewatch || EOS || align=right | 1.8 km || 
|-id=117 bgcolor=#d6d6d6
| 467117 ||  || — || March 4, 2005 || Kitt Peak || Spacewatch || — || align=right | 3.0 km || 
|-id=118 bgcolor=#E9E9E9
| 467118 ||  || — || October 21, 2006 || Mount Lemmon || Mount Lemmon Survey || (5) || align=right data-sort-value="0.81" | 810 m || 
|-id=119 bgcolor=#d6d6d6
| 467119 ||  || — || January 8, 2005 || Campo Imperatore || CINEOS || — || align=right | 2.2 km || 
|-id=120 bgcolor=#E9E9E9
| 467120 ||  || — || May 21, 2004 || Kitt Peak || Spacewatch || — || align=right data-sort-value="0.98" | 980 m || 
|-id=121 bgcolor=#fefefe
| 467121 ||  || — || November 19, 2003 || Kitt Peak || Spacewatch || — || align=right | 1.0 km || 
|-id=122 bgcolor=#fefefe
| 467122 ||  || — || April 10, 2000 || Kitt Peak || Spacewatch || — || align=right data-sort-value="0.79" | 790 m || 
|-id=123 bgcolor=#E9E9E9
| 467123 ||  || — || November 24, 2006 || Mount Lemmon || Mount Lemmon Survey || — || align=right | 1.8 km || 
|-id=124 bgcolor=#fefefe
| 467124 ||  || — || March 25, 2006 || Kitt Peak || Spacewatch || — || align=right data-sort-value="0.85" | 850 m || 
|-id=125 bgcolor=#fefefe
| 467125 ||  || — || March 9, 2005 || Mount Lemmon || Mount Lemmon Survey || MAS || align=right data-sort-value="0.64" | 640 m || 
|-id=126 bgcolor=#fefefe
| 467126 ||  || — || February 27, 2009 || Kitt Peak || Spacewatch || — || align=right data-sort-value="0.72" | 720 m || 
|-id=127 bgcolor=#fefefe
| 467127 ||  || — || April 8, 2006 || Kitt Peak || Spacewatch || — || align=right data-sort-value="0.57" | 570 m || 
|-id=128 bgcolor=#E9E9E9
| 467128 ||  || — || February 6, 2003 || Kitt Peak || Spacewatch || — || align=right | 2.0 km || 
|-id=129 bgcolor=#E9E9E9
| 467129 ||  || — || January 28, 2007 || Mount Lemmon || Mount Lemmon Survey || EUN || align=right | 1.5 km || 
|-id=130 bgcolor=#fefefe
| 467130 ||  || — || March 8, 2005 || Mount Lemmon || Mount Lemmon Survey || NYS || align=right data-sort-value="0.55" | 550 m || 
|-id=131 bgcolor=#d6d6d6
| 467131 ||  || — || February 9, 2005 || Kitt Peak || Spacewatch || — || align=right | 2.1 km || 
|-id=132 bgcolor=#d6d6d6
| 467132 ||  || — || February 1, 2006 || Kitt Peak || Spacewatch || — || align=right | 2.3 km || 
|-id=133 bgcolor=#E9E9E9
| 467133 ||  || — || October 28, 2005 || Mount Lemmon || Mount Lemmon Survey || AEO || align=right | 1.0 km || 
|-id=134 bgcolor=#d6d6d6
| 467134 ||  || — || March 14, 2011 || Mount Lemmon || Mount Lemmon Survey || — || align=right | 2.1 km || 
|-id=135 bgcolor=#E9E9E9
| 467135 ||  || — || February 21, 2007 || Mount Lemmon || Mount Lemmon Survey || WIT || align=right | 1.0 km || 
|-id=136 bgcolor=#d6d6d6
| 467136 ||  || — || January 19, 2005 || Kitt Peak || Spacewatch || — || align=right | 3.6 km || 
|-id=137 bgcolor=#E9E9E9
| 467137 ||  || — || November 6, 2005 || Kitt Peak || Spacewatch || — || align=right | 2.8 km || 
|-id=138 bgcolor=#E9E9E9
| 467138 ||  || — || May 26, 2003 || Kitt Peak || Spacewatch || JUN || align=right | 1.2 km || 
|-id=139 bgcolor=#E9E9E9
| 467139 ||  || — || April 16, 2008 || Mount Lemmon || Mount Lemmon Survey || EUN || align=right | 1.0 km || 
|-id=140 bgcolor=#d6d6d6
| 467140 ||  || — || January 7, 2010 || Kitt Peak || Spacewatch || — || align=right | 3.2 km || 
|-id=141 bgcolor=#fefefe
| 467141 ||  || — || September 15, 2007 || Mount Lemmon || Mount Lemmon Survey || V || align=right data-sort-value="0.67" | 670 m || 
|-id=142 bgcolor=#E9E9E9
| 467142 ||  || — || January 10, 2011 || Mount Lemmon || Mount Lemmon Survey || WIT || align=right | 1.1 km || 
|-id=143 bgcolor=#fefefe
| 467143 ||  || — || October 23, 2011 || Mount Lemmon || Mount Lemmon Survey || — || align=right data-sort-value="0.60" | 600 m || 
|-id=144 bgcolor=#d6d6d6
| 467144 ||  || — || March 10, 2011 || Kitt Peak || Spacewatch || — || align=right | 2.1 km || 
|-id=145 bgcolor=#d6d6d6
| 467145 ||  || — || October 16, 2009 || Mount Lemmon || Mount Lemmon Survey || — || align=right | 1.7 km || 
|-id=146 bgcolor=#d6d6d6
| 467146 ||  || — || December 1, 2008 || Kitt Peak || Spacewatch || — || align=right | 3.2 km || 
|-id=147 bgcolor=#d6d6d6
| 467147 ||  || — || May 22, 2006 || Kitt Peak || Spacewatch || — || align=right | 3.4 km || 
|-id=148 bgcolor=#E9E9E9
| 467148 ||  || — || December 14, 2010 || Mount Lemmon || Mount Lemmon Survey || — || align=right | 1.9 km || 
|-id=149 bgcolor=#E9E9E9
| 467149 ||  || — || March 13, 2012 || Catalina || CSS || EUN || align=right | 1.2 km || 
|-id=150 bgcolor=#d6d6d6
| 467150 ||  || — || April 7, 2010 || WISE || WISE || — || align=right | 2.7 km || 
|-id=151 bgcolor=#E9E9E9
| 467151 ||  || — || February 7, 2002 || Socorro || LINEAR || DOR || align=right | 2.4 km || 
|-id=152 bgcolor=#d6d6d6
| 467152 ||  || — || February 13, 2010 || Mount Lemmon || Mount Lemmon Survey || — || align=right | 2.5 km || 
|-id=153 bgcolor=#fefefe
| 467153 ||  || — || December 28, 2011 || Kitt Peak || Spacewatch || — || align=right data-sort-value="0.85" | 850 m || 
|-id=154 bgcolor=#d6d6d6
| 467154 ||  || — || March 23, 2006 || Kitt Peak || Spacewatch || EOS || align=right | 2.0 km || 
|-id=155 bgcolor=#d6d6d6
| 467155 ||  || — || September 13, 2007 || Mount Lemmon || Mount Lemmon Survey || — || align=right | 3.4 km || 
|-id=156 bgcolor=#fefefe
| 467156 ||  || — || December 5, 2007 || Kitt Peak || Spacewatch || — || align=right data-sort-value="0.70" | 700 m || 
|-id=157 bgcolor=#E9E9E9
| 467157 ||  || — || March 11, 1996 || Kitt Peak || Spacewatch || — || align=right | 1.2 km || 
|-id=158 bgcolor=#d6d6d6
| 467158 ||  || — || April 29, 2010 || WISE || WISE || — || align=right | 4.0 km || 
|-id=159 bgcolor=#d6d6d6
| 467159 ||  || — || January 26, 2006 || Kitt Peak || Spacewatch || KOR || align=right | 1.2 km || 
|-id=160 bgcolor=#fefefe
| 467160 ||  || — || March 10, 2005 || Mount Lemmon || Mount Lemmon Survey || NYS || align=right data-sort-value="0.62" | 620 m || 
|-id=161 bgcolor=#E9E9E9
| 467161 ||  || — || January 28, 2007 || Kitt Peak || Spacewatch || — || align=right | 1.6 km || 
|-id=162 bgcolor=#d6d6d6
| 467162 ||  || — || January 11, 2010 || Mount Lemmon || Mount Lemmon Survey || EOS || align=right | 2.3 km || 
|-id=163 bgcolor=#d6d6d6
| 467163 ||  || — || October 1, 2008 || Kitt Peak || Spacewatch || VER || align=right | 3.0 km || 
|-id=164 bgcolor=#d6d6d6
| 467164 ||  || — || December 20, 2009 || Mount Lemmon || Mount Lemmon Survey || — || align=right | 2.7 km || 
|-id=165 bgcolor=#fefefe
| 467165 ||  || — || February 26, 2006 || Anderson Mesa || LONEOS || — || align=right data-sort-value="0.95" | 950 m || 
|-id=166 bgcolor=#d6d6d6
| 467166 ||  || — || November 17, 2009 || Kitt Peak || Spacewatch || — || align=right | 2.7 km || 
|-id=167 bgcolor=#d6d6d6
| 467167 ||  || — || March 3, 2000 || Socorro || LINEAR || — || align=right | 3.1 km || 
|-id=168 bgcolor=#d6d6d6
| 467168 ||  || — || December 19, 2003 || Socorro || LINEAR || — || align=right | 3.5 km || 
|-id=169 bgcolor=#d6d6d6
| 467169 ||  || — || April 1, 2005 || Catalina || CSS || — || align=right | 3.7 km || 
|-id=170 bgcolor=#E9E9E9
| 467170 ||  || — || March 18, 2004 || Kitt Peak || Spacewatch || — || align=right | 1.3 km || 
|-id=171 bgcolor=#d6d6d6
| 467171 ||  || — || April 4, 2011 || Mount Lemmon || Mount Lemmon Survey || EOS || align=right | 2.1 km || 
|-id=172 bgcolor=#d6d6d6
| 467172 ||  || — || April 8, 2006 || Kitt Peak || Spacewatch || — || align=right | 3.5 km || 
|-id=173 bgcolor=#d6d6d6
| 467173 ||  || — || February 14, 2005 || Catalina || CSS || — || align=right | 2.9 km || 
|-id=174 bgcolor=#fefefe
| 467174 ||  || — || April 6, 2005 || Kitt Peak || Spacewatch || — || align=right | 1.1 km || 
|-id=175 bgcolor=#d6d6d6
| 467175 ||  || — || March 16, 2005 || Catalina || CSS || — || align=right | 3.4 km || 
|-id=176 bgcolor=#d6d6d6
| 467176 ||  || — || September 10, 2007 || Kitt Peak || Spacewatch || — || align=right | 3.3 km || 
|-id=177 bgcolor=#E9E9E9
| 467177 ||  || — || March 20, 2002 || Kitt Peak || Spacewatch || DOR || align=right | 2.1 km || 
|-id=178 bgcolor=#d6d6d6
| 467178 ||  || — || February 16, 2010 || Mount Lemmon || Mount Lemmon Survey || — || align=right | 3.5 km || 
|-id=179 bgcolor=#fefefe
| 467179 ||  || — || November 1, 2008 || Mount Lemmon || Mount Lemmon Survey || — || align=right data-sort-value="0.52" | 520 m || 
|-id=180 bgcolor=#d6d6d6
| 467180 ||  || — || October 27, 2009 || Mount Lemmon || Mount Lemmon Survey || — || align=right | 2.3 km || 
|-id=181 bgcolor=#fefefe
| 467181 ||  || — || February 9, 2005 || Kitt Peak || Spacewatch || MAS || align=right data-sort-value="0.64" | 640 m || 
|-id=182 bgcolor=#E9E9E9
| 467182 ||  || — || October 11, 2009 || Mount Lemmon || Mount Lemmon Survey || — || align=right | 2.2 km || 
|-id=183 bgcolor=#E9E9E9
| 467183 ||  || — || August 17, 2009 || Kitt Peak || Spacewatch || — || align=right | 1.9 km || 
|-id=184 bgcolor=#E9E9E9
| 467184 ||  || — || December 17, 2006 || Catalina || CSS || — || align=right | 1.7 km || 
|-id=185 bgcolor=#d6d6d6
| 467185 ||  || — || November 10, 1999 || Kitt Peak || Spacewatch || — || align=right | 2.3 km || 
|-id=186 bgcolor=#E9E9E9
| 467186 ||  || — || September 26, 1995 || Kitt Peak || Spacewatch || — || align=right | 3.3 km || 
|-id=187 bgcolor=#d6d6d6
| 467187 ||  || — || April 7, 2006 || Kitt Peak || Spacewatch || — || align=right | 3.0 km || 
|-id=188 bgcolor=#fefefe
| 467188 ||  || — || February 9, 2005 || Mount Lemmon || Mount Lemmon Survey || NYS || align=right data-sort-value="0.58" | 580 m || 
|-id=189 bgcolor=#fefefe
| 467189 ||  || — || March 26, 2009 || Kitt Peak || Spacewatch || — || align=right data-sort-value="0.87" | 870 m || 
|-id=190 bgcolor=#d6d6d6
| 467190 ||  || — || January 6, 2010 || Kitt Peak || Spacewatch || — || align=right | 3.4 km || 
|-id=191 bgcolor=#d6d6d6
| 467191 ||  || — || October 6, 1999 || Kitt Peak || Spacewatch || — || align=right | 3.5 km || 
|-id=192 bgcolor=#d6d6d6
| 467192 ||  || — || October 9, 2007 || Mount Lemmon || Mount Lemmon Survey || — || align=right | 2.3 km || 
|-id=193 bgcolor=#fefefe
| 467193 ||  || — || March 5, 2006 || Kitt Peak || Spacewatch || — || align=right data-sort-value="0.65" | 650 m || 
|-id=194 bgcolor=#E9E9E9
| 467194 ||  || — || September 30, 2005 || Mount Lemmon || Mount Lemmon Survey || — || align=right | 1.2 km || 
|-id=195 bgcolor=#E9E9E9
| 467195 ||  || — || September 27, 2009 || Kitt Peak || Spacewatch || — || align=right | 1.8 km || 
|-id=196 bgcolor=#fefefe
| 467196 ||  || — || October 11, 2007 || Kitt Peak || Spacewatch || — || align=right data-sort-value="0.84" | 840 m || 
|-id=197 bgcolor=#fefefe
| 467197 ||  || — || September 16, 2010 || Mount Lemmon || Mount Lemmon Survey || V || align=right data-sort-value="0.65" | 650 m || 
|-id=198 bgcolor=#d6d6d6
| 467198 ||  || — || September 23, 2001 || Kitt Peak || Spacewatch || — || align=right | 4.8 km || 
|-id=199 bgcolor=#d6d6d6
| 467199 ||  || — || March 3, 2005 || Catalina || CSS || — || align=right | 2.7 km || 
|-id=200 bgcolor=#E9E9E9
| 467200 ||  || — || September 11, 2005 || Kitt Peak || Spacewatch || — || align=right data-sort-value="0.95" | 950 m || 
|}

467201–467300 

|-bgcolor=#fefefe
| 467201 ||  || — || March 3, 2005 || Catalina || CSS || — || align=right data-sort-value="0.70" | 700 m || 
|-id=202 bgcolor=#d6d6d6
| 467202 ||  || — || October 22, 2008 || Kitt Peak || Spacewatch || EOS || align=right | 2.0 km || 
|-id=203 bgcolor=#E9E9E9
| 467203 ||  || — || May 30, 2008 || Kitt Peak || Spacewatch || — || align=right | 1.3 km || 
|-id=204 bgcolor=#fefefe
| 467204 ||  || — || December 17, 2001 || Socorro || LINEAR || — || align=right | 1.1 km || 
|-id=205 bgcolor=#fefefe
| 467205 ||  || — || March 24, 2006 || Kitt Peak || Spacewatch || — || align=right data-sort-value="0.70" | 700 m || 
|-id=206 bgcolor=#fefefe
| 467206 ||  || — || March 10, 2005 || Mount Lemmon || Mount Lemmon Survey || — || align=right data-sort-value="0.84" | 840 m || 
|-id=207 bgcolor=#fefefe
| 467207 ||  || — || January 20, 2009 || Mount Lemmon || Mount Lemmon Survey || — || align=right data-sort-value="0.86" | 860 m || 
|-id=208 bgcolor=#d6d6d6
| 467208 ||  || — || February 16, 2010 || Kitt Peak || Spacewatch || — || align=right | 2.9 km || 
|-id=209 bgcolor=#E9E9E9
| 467209 ||  || — || February 24, 2012 || Mount Lemmon || Mount Lemmon Survey || — || align=right data-sort-value="0.98" | 980 m || 
|-id=210 bgcolor=#d6d6d6
| 467210 ||  || — || March 31, 2005 || Anderson Mesa || LONEOS || — || align=right | 4.1 km || 
|-id=211 bgcolor=#fefefe
| 467211 ||  || — || April 6, 2005 || Catalina || CSS || — || align=right data-sort-value="0.77" | 770 m || 
|-id=212 bgcolor=#fefefe
| 467212 ||  || — || February 27, 2008 || Kitt Peak || Spacewatch || — || align=right data-sort-value="0.94" | 940 m || 
|-id=213 bgcolor=#fefefe
| 467213 ||  || — || December 18, 2004 || Mount Lemmon || Mount Lemmon Survey || — || align=right data-sort-value="0.74" | 740 m || 
|-id=214 bgcolor=#d6d6d6
| 467214 ||  || — || September 13, 2007 || Mount Lemmon || Mount Lemmon Survey || — || align=right | 3.7 km || 
|-id=215 bgcolor=#fefefe
| 467215 ||  || — || September 12, 2007 || Mount Lemmon || Mount Lemmon Survey || — || align=right data-sort-value="0.58" | 580 m || 
|-id=216 bgcolor=#d6d6d6
| 467216 ||  || — || May 7, 2010 || WISE || WISE || — || align=right | 3.2 km || 
|-id=217 bgcolor=#E9E9E9
| 467217 ||  || — || October 5, 2005 || Kitt Peak || Spacewatch || — || align=right | 1.4 km || 
|-id=218 bgcolor=#d6d6d6
| 467218 ||  || — || April 17, 2010 || WISE || WISE || — || align=right | 2.9 km || 
|-id=219 bgcolor=#d6d6d6
| 467219 ||  || — || September 26, 2006 || Catalina || CSS || — || align=right | 3.2 km || 
|-id=220 bgcolor=#E9E9E9
| 467220 ||  || — || September 17, 2010 || Mount Lemmon || Mount Lemmon Survey || — || align=right | 1.4 km || 
|-id=221 bgcolor=#E9E9E9
| 467221 ||  || — || April 6, 2008 || Kitt Peak || Spacewatch || — || align=right data-sort-value="0.81" | 810 m || 
|-id=222 bgcolor=#d6d6d6
| 467222 ||  || — || March 24, 2006 || Mount Lemmon || Mount Lemmon Survey || — || align=right | 2.8 km || 
|-id=223 bgcolor=#fefefe
| 467223 ||  || — || October 12, 2007 || Kitt Peak || Spacewatch || — || align=right data-sort-value="0.73" | 730 m || 
|-id=224 bgcolor=#d6d6d6
| 467224 ||  || — || September 24, 2008 || Mount Lemmon || Mount Lemmon Survey || — || align=right | 2.2 km || 
|-id=225 bgcolor=#E9E9E9
| 467225 ||  || — || January 13, 1999 || Kitt Peak || Spacewatch || — || align=right | 1.7 km || 
|-id=226 bgcolor=#d6d6d6
| 467226 ||  || — || April 27, 2010 || WISE || WISE || — || align=right | 3.1 km || 
|-id=227 bgcolor=#E9E9E9
| 467227 ||  || — || November 20, 2006 || Kitt Peak || Spacewatch || — || align=right | 1.1 km || 
|-id=228 bgcolor=#E9E9E9
| 467228 ||  || — || February 13, 2008 || Mount Lemmon || Mount Lemmon Survey || — || align=right | 1.2 km || 
|-id=229 bgcolor=#d6d6d6
| 467229 ||  || — || March 4, 2005 || Kitt Peak || Spacewatch || — || align=right | 2.6 km || 
|-id=230 bgcolor=#d6d6d6
| 467230 ||  || — || March 8, 2005 || Mount Lemmon || Mount Lemmon Survey || — || align=right | 3.0 km || 
|-id=231 bgcolor=#fefefe
| 467231 ||  || — || February 23, 1998 || Kitt Peak || Spacewatch || — || align=right data-sort-value="0.67" | 670 m || 
|-id=232 bgcolor=#fefefe
| 467232 ||  || — || September 20, 2006 || Catalina || CSS || — || align=right data-sort-value="0.89" | 890 m || 
|-id=233 bgcolor=#fefefe
| 467233 ||  || — || December 5, 2007 || Kitt Peak || Spacewatch || — || align=right data-sort-value="0.90" | 900 m || 
|-id=234 bgcolor=#E9E9E9
| 467234 ||  || — || October 29, 2014 || Catalina || CSS || — || align=right | 1.9 km || 
|-id=235 bgcolor=#E9E9E9
| 467235 ||  || — || February 26, 2012 || Mount Lemmon || Mount Lemmon Survey || — || align=right data-sort-value="0.94" | 940 m || 
|-id=236 bgcolor=#d6d6d6
| 467236 ||  || — || September 5, 2008 || Kitt Peak || Spacewatch || — || align=right | 2.8 km || 
|-id=237 bgcolor=#fefefe
| 467237 ||  || — || October 2, 2010 || Kitt Peak || Spacewatch || — || align=right data-sort-value="0.79" | 790 m || 
|-id=238 bgcolor=#E9E9E9
| 467238 ||  || — || October 25, 2005 || Mount Lemmon || Mount Lemmon Survey || — || align=right | 2.9 km || 
|-id=239 bgcolor=#d6d6d6
| 467239 ||  || — || February 14, 2010 || Mount Lemmon || Mount Lemmon Survey || — || align=right | 3.1 km || 
|-id=240 bgcolor=#d6d6d6
| 467240 ||  || — || March 17, 2005 || Kitt Peak || Spacewatch || — || align=right | 2.5 km || 
|-id=241 bgcolor=#E9E9E9
| 467241 ||  || — || November 7, 2010 || Mount Lemmon || Mount Lemmon Survey || — || align=right | 1.3 km || 
|-id=242 bgcolor=#d6d6d6
| 467242 ||  || — || April 14, 2005 || Kitt Peak || Spacewatch || — || align=right | 3.4 km || 
|-id=243 bgcolor=#fefefe
| 467243 ||  || — || October 29, 1994 || Kitt Peak || Spacewatch || — || align=right | 1.4 km || 
|-id=244 bgcolor=#fefefe
| 467244 ||  || — || November 18, 2007 || Mount Lemmon || Mount Lemmon Survey || — || align=right data-sort-value="0.67" | 670 m || 
|-id=245 bgcolor=#E9E9E9
| 467245 ||  || — || November 10, 2004 || Kitt Peak || Spacewatch || AGN || align=right | 1.4 km || 
|-id=246 bgcolor=#E9E9E9
| 467246 ||  || — || March 27, 2012 || Kitt Peak || Spacewatch || — || align=right | 1.2 km || 
|-id=247 bgcolor=#E9E9E9
| 467247 ||  || — || January 25, 2006 || Kitt Peak || Spacewatch || — || align=right | 2.3 km || 
|-id=248 bgcolor=#fefefe
| 467248 ||  || — || February 7, 2008 || Mount Lemmon || Mount Lemmon Survey || — || align=right data-sort-value="0.73" | 730 m || 
|-id=249 bgcolor=#d6d6d6
| 467249 ||  || — || March 27, 1995 || Kitt Peak || Spacewatch || — || align=right | 2.4 km || 
|-id=250 bgcolor=#d6d6d6
| 467250 ||  || — || December 20, 2004 || Mount Lemmon || Mount Lemmon Survey || — || align=right | 2.2 km || 
|-id=251 bgcolor=#d6d6d6
| 467251 ||  || — || June 20, 2006 || Kitt Peak || Spacewatch || EOS || align=right | 2.2 km || 
|-id=252 bgcolor=#fefefe
| 467252 ||  || — || December 14, 2004 || Kitt Peak || Spacewatch || — || align=right | 1.1 km || 
|-id=253 bgcolor=#d6d6d6
| 467253 ||  || — || October 26, 2008 || Mount Lemmon || Mount Lemmon Survey || — || align=right | 4.0 km || 
|-id=254 bgcolor=#d6d6d6
| 467254 ||  || — || October 29, 2003 || Kitt Peak || Spacewatch || — || align=right | 3.3 km || 
|-id=255 bgcolor=#d6d6d6
| 467255 ||  || — || September 11, 2007 || Mount Lemmon || Mount Lemmon Survey ||  || align=right | 3.7 km || 
|-id=256 bgcolor=#d6d6d6
| 467256 ||  || — || March 24, 2006 || Mount Lemmon || Mount Lemmon Survey || — || align=right | 2.8 km || 
|-id=257 bgcolor=#E9E9E9
| 467257 ||  || — || February 24, 2012 || Mount Lemmon || Mount Lemmon Survey || — || align=right | 1.4 km || 
|-id=258 bgcolor=#d6d6d6
| 467258 ||  || — || February 4, 2006 || Kitt Peak || Spacewatch || KOR || align=right | 1.4 km || 
|-id=259 bgcolor=#E9E9E9
| 467259 ||  || — || January 10, 2011 || Mount Lemmon || Mount Lemmon Survey || — || align=right | 1.8 km || 
|-id=260 bgcolor=#fefefe
| 467260 ||  || — || November 20, 2003 || Kitt Peak || Spacewatch || — || align=right data-sort-value="0.85" | 850 m || 
|-id=261 bgcolor=#fefefe
| 467261 ||  || — || March 13, 2005 || Mount Lemmon || Mount Lemmon Survey || — || align=right data-sort-value="0.81" | 810 m || 
|-id=262 bgcolor=#fefefe
| 467262 ||  || — || February 2, 2005 || Kitt Peak || Spacewatch || ERI || align=right | 1.7 km || 
|-id=263 bgcolor=#fefefe
| 467263 ||  || — || April 19, 2006 || Kitt Peak || Spacewatch || — || align=right data-sort-value="0.83" | 830 m || 
|-id=264 bgcolor=#E9E9E9
| 467264 ||  || — || September 30, 2005 || Kitt Peak || Spacewatch || — || align=right data-sort-value="0.97" | 970 m || 
|-id=265 bgcolor=#E9E9E9
| 467265 ||  || — || October 2, 2013 || Catalina || CSS || — || align=right | 1.9 km || 
|-id=266 bgcolor=#E9E9E9
| 467266 ||  || — || March 27, 2008 || Mount Lemmon || Mount Lemmon Survey || MAR || align=right | 1.1 km || 
|-id=267 bgcolor=#d6d6d6
| 467267 ||  || — || September 20, 2009 || Mount Lemmon || Mount Lemmon Survey || TEL || align=right | 1.4 km || 
|-id=268 bgcolor=#d6d6d6
| 467268 ||  || — || August 19, 2003 || Campo Imperatore || CINEOS || — || align=right | 2.9 km || 
|-id=269 bgcolor=#d6d6d6
| 467269 ||  || — || September 13, 2007 || Mount Lemmon || Mount Lemmon Survey || — || align=right | 2.9 km || 
|-id=270 bgcolor=#E9E9E9
| 467270 ||  || — || October 20, 1995 || Kitt Peak || Spacewatch || — || align=right | 2.9 km || 
|-id=271 bgcolor=#d6d6d6
| 467271 ||  || — || November 19, 2003 || Kitt Peak || Spacewatch || — || align=right | 3.1 km || 
|-id=272 bgcolor=#E9E9E9
| 467272 ||  || — || September 17, 2010 || Mount Lemmon || Mount Lemmon Survey || — || align=right | 1.4 km || 
|-id=273 bgcolor=#E9E9E9
| 467273 ||  || — || October 27, 2006 || Kitt Peak || Spacewatch || — || align=right data-sort-value="0.89" | 890 m || 
|-id=274 bgcolor=#E9E9E9
| 467274 ||  || — || December 6, 2010 || Mount Lemmon || Mount Lemmon Survey || — || align=right | 2.2 km || 
|-id=275 bgcolor=#E9E9E9
| 467275 ||  || — || October 20, 2005 || Mount Lemmon || Mount Lemmon Survey || — || align=right | 1.7 km || 
|-id=276 bgcolor=#d6d6d6
| 467276 ||  || — || October 17, 2003 || Kitt Peak || Spacewatch || EOS || align=right | 1.6 km || 
|-id=277 bgcolor=#d6d6d6
| 467277 ||  || — || November 6, 2008 || Mount Lemmon || Mount Lemmon Survey || — || align=right | 3.9 km || 
|-id=278 bgcolor=#E9E9E9
| 467278 ||  || — || May 11, 2008 || Kitt Peak || Spacewatch || — || align=right | 1.4 km || 
|-id=279 bgcolor=#E9E9E9
| 467279 ||  || — || October 22, 2005 || Kitt Peak || Spacewatch || — || align=right data-sort-value="0.90" | 900 m || 
|-id=280 bgcolor=#d6d6d6
| 467280 ||  || — || November 8, 2008 || Mount Lemmon || Mount Lemmon Survey || — || align=right | 3.2 km || 
|-id=281 bgcolor=#d6d6d6
| 467281 ||  || — || March 8, 2005 || Mount Lemmon || Mount Lemmon Survey || — || align=right | 2.5 km || 
|-id=282 bgcolor=#d6d6d6
| 467282 ||  || — || March 15, 2010 || Kitt Peak || Spacewatch || — || align=right | 3.5 km || 
|-id=283 bgcolor=#d6d6d6
| 467283 ||  || — || March 3, 2000 || Socorro || LINEAR || — || align=right | 3.1 km || 
|-id=284 bgcolor=#fefefe
| 467284 ||  || — || February 2, 2012 || Mount Lemmon || Mount Lemmon Survey || — || align=right | 1.1 km || 
|-id=285 bgcolor=#fefefe
| 467285 ||  || — || March 9, 2005 || Mount Lemmon || Mount Lemmon Survey || NYS || align=right data-sort-value="0.75" | 750 m || 
|-id=286 bgcolor=#fefefe
| 467286 ||  || — || February 24, 1998 || Kitt Peak || Spacewatch || — || align=right data-sort-value="0.74" | 740 m || 
|-id=287 bgcolor=#d6d6d6
| 467287 ||  || — || November 17, 2004 || Campo Imperatore || CINEOS || KOR || align=right | 1.8 km || 
|-id=288 bgcolor=#d6d6d6
| 467288 ||  || — || September 22, 2003 || Kitt Peak || Spacewatch || EOS || align=right | 1.9 km || 
|-id=289 bgcolor=#d6d6d6
| 467289 ||  || — || March 14, 2011 || Mount Lemmon || Mount Lemmon Survey || — || align=right | 2.3 km || 
|-id=290 bgcolor=#fefefe
| 467290 ||  || — || May 30, 2006 || Mount Lemmon || Mount Lemmon Survey || — || align=right | 1.0 km || 
|-id=291 bgcolor=#d6d6d6
| 467291 ||  || — || October 6, 2008 || Mount Lemmon || Mount Lemmon Survey || — || align=right | 3.3 km || 
|-id=292 bgcolor=#fefefe
| 467292 ||  || — || December 19, 2007 || Mount Lemmon || Mount Lemmon Survey || V || align=right data-sort-value="0.80" | 800 m || 
|-id=293 bgcolor=#E9E9E9
| 467293 ||  || — || September 29, 2005 || Kitt Peak || Spacewatch || — || align=right | 2.3 km || 
|-id=294 bgcolor=#d6d6d6
| 467294 ||  || — || April 15, 2010 || WISE || WISE || — || align=right | 4.1 km || 
|-id=295 bgcolor=#E9E9E9
| 467295 ||  || — || November 18, 2006 || Mount Lemmon || Mount Lemmon Survey || — || align=right data-sort-value="0.89" | 890 m || 
|-id=296 bgcolor=#fefefe
| 467296 ||  || — || February 3, 2009 || Kitt Peak || Spacewatch || — || align=right data-sort-value="0.66" | 660 m || 
|-id=297 bgcolor=#d6d6d6
| 467297 ||  || — || April 6, 2005 || Kitt Peak || Spacewatch || HYG || align=right | 3.5 km || 
|-id=298 bgcolor=#E9E9E9
| 467298 ||  || — || February 7, 2002 || Kitt Peak || Spacewatch || NEM || align=right | 2.5 km || 
|-id=299 bgcolor=#E9E9E9
| 467299 ||  || — || December 24, 2006 || Kitt Peak || Spacewatch || — || align=right | 1.2 km || 
|-id=300 bgcolor=#fefefe
| 467300 ||  || — || March 19, 2001 || Kitt Peak || Spacewatch || — || align=right data-sort-value="0.74" | 740 m || 
|}

467301–467400 

|-bgcolor=#E9E9E9
| 467301 ||  || — || April 11, 2003 || Kitt Peak || Spacewatch || — || align=right | 2.1 km || 
|-id=302 bgcolor=#E9E9E9
| 467302 ||  || — || October 18, 2009 || Mount Lemmon || Mount Lemmon Survey || — || align=right | 1.8 km || 
|-id=303 bgcolor=#E9E9E9
| 467303 ||  || — || September 25, 2005 || Kitt Peak || Spacewatch || — || align=right | 1.1 km || 
|-id=304 bgcolor=#d6d6d6
| 467304 ||  || — || January 6, 2010 || Kitt Peak || Spacewatch || — || align=right | 2.6 km || 
|-id=305 bgcolor=#fefefe
| 467305 ||  || — || September 30, 2006 || Mount Lemmon || Mount Lemmon Survey || — || align=right data-sort-value="0.91" | 910 m || 
|-id=306 bgcolor=#E9E9E9
| 467306 ||  || — || December 26, 2005 || Mount Lemmon || Mount Lemmon Survey || — || align=right | 2.4 km || 
|-id=307 bgcolor=#fefefe
| 467307 ||  || — || December 22, 2004 || Catalina || CSS || — || align=right data-sort-value="0.89" | 890 m || 
|-id=308 bgcolor=#fefefe
| 467308 ||  || — || April 4, 2005 || Mount Lemmon || Mount Lemmon Survey || — || align=right data-sort-value="0.69" | 690 m || 
|-id=309 bgcolor=#FFC2E0
| 467309 ||  || — || January 14, 1996 || Kitt Peak || Spacewatch || APOPHA || align=right data-sort-value="0.37" | 370 m || 
|-id=310 bgcolor=#fefefe
| 467310 ||  || — || September 14, 1996 || Kitt Peak || Spacewatch || — || align=right data-sort-value="0.71" | 710 m || 
|-id=311 bgcolor=#fefefe
| 467311 ||  || — || October 13, 1998 || Kitt Peak || Spacewatch || — || align=right data-sort-value="0.79" | 790 m || 
|-id=312 bgcolor=#fefefe
| 467312 ||  || — || November 15, 1998 || Kitt Peak || Spacewatch || — || align=right data-sort-value="0.58" | 580 m || 
|-id=313 bgcolor=#fefefe
| 467313 ||  || — || January 15, 1999 || Kitt Peak || Spacewatch || — || align=right data-sort-value="0.55" | 550 m || 
|-id=314 bgcolor=#d6d6d6
| 467314 ||  || — || February 6, 1999 || Mauna Kea || C. Veillet || — || align=right | 2.4 km || 
|-id=315 bgcolor=#E9E9E9
| 467315 ||  || — || October 7, 1999 || Catalina || CSS || — || align=right | 2.1 km || 
|-id=316 bgcolor=#fefefe
| 467316 ||  || — || October 31, 1999 || Kitt Peak || Spacewatch || NYS || align=right data-sort-value="0.53" | 530 m || 
|-id=317 bgcolor=#FFC2E0
| 467317 ||  || — || August 26, 2000 || Haleakala || NEAT || AMOPHA || align=right data-sort-value="0.45" | 450 m || 
|-id=318 bgcolor=#d6d6d6
| 467318 ||  || — || September 24, 2000 || Socorro || LINEAR || — || align=right | 4.1 km || 
|-id=319 bgcolor=#E9E9E9
| 467319 ||  || — || October 30, 2000 || Socorro || LINEAR || — || align=right | 2.2 km || 
|-id=320 bgcolor=#d6d6d6
| 467320 ||  || — || April 26, 2001 || Kitt Peak || Spacewatch || — || align=right | 2.3 km || 
|-id=321 bgcolor=#d6d6d6
| 467321 ||  || — || August 10, 2001 || Palomar || NEAT || — || align=right | 3.6 km || 
|-id=322 bgcolor=#fefefe
| 467322 ||  || — || August 9, 2001 || Palomar || NEAT || H || align=right data-sort-value="0.83" | 830 m || 
|-id=323 bgcolor=#E9E9E9
| 467323 ||  || — || September 10, 2001 || Anderson Mesa || LONEOS || — || align=right | 1.9 km || 
|-id=324 bgcolor=#fefefe
| 467324 ||  || — || September 20, 2001 || Socorro || LINEAR || — || align=right data-sort-value="0.81" | 810 m || 
|-id=325 bgcolor=#E9E9E9
| 467325 ||  || — || October 14, 2001 || Apache Point || SDSS || — || align=right data-sort-value="0.70" | 700 m || 
|-id=326 bgcolor=#E9E9E9
| 467326 ||  || — || October 17, 2001 || Socorro || LINEAR || — || align=right | 2.2 km || 
|-id=327 bgcolor=#fefefe
| 467327 ||  || — || October 20, 2001 || Socorro || LINEAR || H || align=right data-sort-value="0.53" | 530 m || 
|-id=328 bgcolor=#E9E9E9
| 467328 ||  || — || October 20, 2001 || Socorro || LINEAR || RAF || align=right data-sort-value="0.77" | 770 m || 
|-id=329 bgcolor=#d6d6d6
| 467329 ||  || — || September 20, 2001 || Socorro || LINEAR || — || align=right | 3.1 km || 
|-id=330 bgcolor=#fefefe
| 467330 ||  || — || October 21, 2001 || Socorro || LINEAR || — || align=right data-sort-value="0.90" | 900 m || 
|-id=331 bgcolor=#E9E9E9
| 467331 ||  || — || November 21, 2001 || Socorro || LINEAR || — || align=right | 1.7 km || 
|-id=332 bgcolor=#d6d6d6
| 467332 ||  || — || December 18, 2001 || Socorro || LINEAR || Tj (2.96) || align=right | 4.1 km || 
|-id=333 bgcolor=#E9E9E9
| 467333 ||  || — || January 22, 2002 || Kitt Peak || Spacewatch || — || align=right | 1.2 km || 
|-id=334 bgcolor=#fefefe
| 467334 ||  || — || February 8, 2002 || Socorro || LINEAR || — || align=right data-sort-value="0.89" | 890 m || 
|-id=335 bgcolor=#FFC2E0
| 467335 ||  || — || May 5, 2002 || Palomar || NEAT || AMO || align=right data-sort-value="0.56" | 560 m || 
|-id=336 bgcolor=#FFC2E0
| 467336 ||  || — || June 12, 2002 || Socorro || LINEAR || ATEPHAcritical || align=right data-sort-value="0.28" | 280 m || 
|-id=337 bgcolor=#fefefe
| 467337 ||  || — || August 9, 2002 || Haleakala || NEAT || — || align=right data-sort-value="0.79" | 790 m || 
|-id=338 bgcolor=#fefefe
| 467338 ||  || — || August 8, 2002 || Palomar || NEAT || MAS || align=right data-sort-value="0.54" | 540 m || 
|-id=339 bgcolor=#fefefe
| 467339 ||  || — || August 17, 2002 || Palomar || NEAT || NYS || align=right data-sort-value="0.45" | 450 m || 
|-id=340 bgcolor=#d6d6d6
| 467340 ||  || — || September 29, 2002 || Haleakala || NEAT || 3:2 || align=right | 3.8 km || 
|-id=341 bgcolor=#d6d6d6
| 467341 ||  || — || October 2, 2002 || Socorro || LINEAR || SHU3:2 || align=right | 6.1 km || 
|-id=342 bgcolor=#d6d6d6
| 467342 ||  || — || October 5, 2002 || Apache Point || SDSS || — || align=right | 2.3 km || 
|-id=343 bgcolor=#d6d6d6
| 467343 ||  || — || October 10, 2002 || Apache Point || SDSS || EOS || align=right | 1.7 km || 
|-id=344 bgcolor=#d6d6d6
| 467344 ||  || — || October 30, 2002 || Kitt Peak || Spacewatch || Tj (2.96) || align=right | 4.4 km || 
|-id=345 bgcolor=#fefefe
| 467345 ||  || — || November 16, 2002 || Palomar || NEAT || — || align=right data-sort-value="0.82" | 820 m || 
|-id=346 bgcolor=#E9E9E9
| 467346 ||  || — || January 10, 2003 || Socorro || LINEAR || — || align=right | 3.5 km || 
|-id=347 bgcolor=#FFC2E0
| 467347 ||  || — || April 3, 2003 || Anderson Mesa || LONEOS || APOcritical || align=right data-sort-value="0.27" | 270 m || 
|-id=348 bgcolor=#E9E9E9
| 467348 ||  || — || April 9, 2003 || Socorro || LINEAR || — || align=right | 1.9 km || 
|-id=349 bgcolor=#E9E9E9
| 467349 ||  || — || April 11, 2003 || Kitt Peak || Spacewatch || — || align=right | 1.8 km || 
|-id=350 bgcolor=#E9E9E9
| 467350 ||  || — || May 1, 2003 || Kitt Peak || Spacewatch || JUN || align=right data-sort-value="0.83" | 830 m || 
|-id=351 bgcolor=#FFC2E0
| 467351 ||  || — || May 22, 2003 || Socorro || LINEAR || ATEPHA || align=right data-sort-value="0.30" | 300 m || 
|-id=352 bgcolor=#FFC2E0
| 467352 ||  || — || May 31, 2003 || Socorro || LINEAR || ATEcritical || align=right data-sort-value="0.47" | 470 m || 
|-id=353 bgcolor=#E9E9E9
| 467353 ||  || — || June 28, 2003 || Socorro || LINEAR || — || align=right | 1.9 km || 
|-id=354 bgcolor=#fefefe
| 467354 ||  || — || July 7, 2003 || Kitt Peak || Spacewatch || — || align=right data-sort-value="0.79" | 790 m || 
|-id=355 bgcolor=#E9E9E9
| 467355 ||  || — || July 24, 2003 || Wise || Wise Obs. || — || align=right | 3.4 km || 
|-id=356 bgcolor=#E9E9E9
| 467356 ||  || — || August 20, 2003 || Campo Imperatore || CINEOS || DOR || align=right | 2.2 km || 
|-id=357 bgcolor=#E9E9E9
| 467357 ||  || — || August 26, 2003 || Socorro || LINEAR || — || align=right | 2.2 km || 
|-id=358 bgcolor=#fefefe
| 467358 ||  || — || September 20, 2003 || Kitt Peak || Spacewatch || — || align=right data-sort-value="0.74" | 740 m || 
|-id=359 bgcolor=#fefefe
| 467359 ||  || — || September 20, 2003 || Kitt Peak || Spacewatch || — || align=right data-sort-value="0.81" | 810 m || 
|-id=360 bgcolor=#FA8072
| 467360 ||  || — || September 21, 2003 || Anderson Mesa || LONEOS || — || align=right data-sort-value="0.65" | 650 m || 
|-id=361 bgcolor=#fefefe
| 467361 ||  || — || August 31, 2003 || Kitt Peak || Spacewatch || — || align=right data-sort-value="0.62" | 620 m || 
|-id=362 bgcolor=#fefefe
| 467362 ||  || — || August 26, 2003 || Socorro || LINEAR || — || align=right data-sort-value="0.78" | 780 m || 
|-id=363 bgcolor=#E9E9E9
| 467363 ||  || — || October 22, 2003 || Socorro || LINEAR || — || align=right | 1.8 km || 
|-id=364 bgcolor=#fefefe
| 467364 ||  || — || October 25, 2003 || Socorro || LINEAR || — || align=right data-sort-value="0.97" | 970 m || 
|-id=365 bgcolor=#FA8072
| 467365 ||  || — || November 20, 2003 || Socorro || LINEAR || — || align=right | 1.3 km || 
|-id=366 bgcolor=#d6d6d6
| 467366 ||  || — || October 29, 2003 || Socorro || LINEAR || — || align=right | 2.7 km || 
|-id=367 bgcolor=#d6d6d6
| 467367 ||  || — || December 19, 2003 || Kitt Peak || Spacewatch || — || align=right | 2.4 km || 
|-id=368 bgcolor=#d6d6d6
| 467368 ||  || — || January 30, 2004 || Kitt Peak || Spacewatch || — || align=right | 3.0 km || 
|-id=369 bgcolor=#d6d6d6
| 467369 ||  || — || February 12, 2004 || Kitt Peak || Spacewatch || — || align=right | 2.7 km || 
|-id=370 bgcolor=#d6d6d6
| 467370 ||  || — || March 14, 2004 || Socorro || LINEAR || — || align=right | 3.7 km || 
|-id=371 bgcolor=#E9E9E9
| 467371 ||  || — || April 30, 2004 || Kitt Peak || Spacewatch || — || align=right | 1.8 km || 
|-id=372 bgcolor=#FFC2E0
| 467372 ||  || — || June 9, 2004 || Socorro || LINEAR || APO +1kmcritical || align=right data-sort-value="0.87" | 870 m || 
|-id=373 bgcolor=#E9E9E9
| 467373 ||  || — || August 24, 2004 || Siding Spring || SSS || Tj (2.99) || align=right | 4.0 km || 
|-id=374 bgcolor=#E9E9E9
| 467374 ||  || — || August 25, 2004 || Kitt Peak || Spacewatch || — || align=right | 1.3 km || 
|-id=375 bgcolor=#E9E9E9
| 467375 ||  || — || August 26, 2004 || Catalina || CSS || — || align=right | 1.4 km || 
|-id=376 bgcolor=#E9E9E9
| 467376 ||  || — || July 20, 2004 || Siding Spring || SSS || — || align=right | 2.0 km || 
|-id=377 bgcolor=#fefefe
| 467377 ||  || — || September 9, 2004 || Socorro || LINEAR || — || align=right data-sort-value="0.83" | 830 m || 
|-id=378 bgcolor=#fefefe
| 467378 ||  || — || September 15, 2004 || Kitt Peak || Spacewatch || — || align=right data-sort-value="0.64" | 640 m || 
|-id=379 bgcolor=#fefefe
| 467379 ||  || — || September 16, 2004 || Socorro || LINEAR || H || align=right data-sort-value="0.83" | 830 m || 
|-id=380 bgcolor=#E9E9E9
| 467380 ||  || — || October 7, 2004 || Socorro || LINEAR || — || align=right | 1.7 km || 
|-id=381 bgcolor=#E9E9E9
| 467381 ||  || — || October 8, 2004 || Anderson Mesa || LONEOS || — || align=right | 1.5 km || 
|-id=382 bgcolor=#fefefe
| 467382 ||  || — || October 6, 2004 || Kitt Peak || Spacewatch || — || align=right data-sort-value="0.74" | 740 m || 
|-id=383 bgcolor=#fefefe
| 467383 ||  || — || October 4, 2004 || Kitt Peak || Spacewatch || — || align=right data-sort-value="0.64" | 640 m || 
|-id=384 bgcolor=#E9E9E9
| 467384 ||  || — || October 7, 2004 || Kitt Peak || Spacewatch || — || align=right | 1.4 km || 
|-id=385 bgcolor=#E9E9E9
| 467385 ||  || — || October 10, 2004 || Kitt Peak || Spacewatch || — || align=right | 2.0 km || 
|-id=386 bgcolor=#E9E9E9
| 467386 ||  || — || October 14, 2004 || Kitt Peak || Spacewatch || — || align=right | 1.5 km || 
|-id=387 bgcolor=#E9E9E9
| 467387 ||  || — || November 4, 2004 || Kitt Peak || Spacewatch || JUN || align=right data-sort-value="0.92" | 920 m || 
|-id=388 bgcolor=#fefefe
| 467388 ||  || — || December 3, 2004 || Kitt Peak || Spacewatch || H || align=right data-sort-value="0.71" | 710 m || 
|-id=389 bgcolor=#E9E9E9
| 467389 ||  || — || November 4, 2004 || Catalina || CSS || — || align=right | 2.8 km || 
|-id=390 bgcolor=#E9E9E9
| 467390 ||  || — || December 11, 2004 || Socorro || LINEAR || — || align=right | 1.9 km || 
|-id=391 bgcolor=#fefefe
| 467391 ||  || — || December 14, 2004 || Campo Imperatore || CINEOS || — || align=right | 2.4 km || 
|-id=392 bgcolor=#fefefe
| 467392 ||  || — || February 1, 2005 || Kitt Peak || Spacewatch || H || align=right data-sort-value="0.59" | 590 m || 
|-id=393 bgcolor=#fefefe
| 467393 ||  || — || January 15, 2005 || Kitt Peak || Spacewatch || — || align=right data-sort-value="0.67" | 670 m || 
|-id=394 bgcolor=#fefefe
| 467394 ||  || — || March 8, 2005 || Kitt Peak || Spacewatch || — || align=right data-sort-value="0.60" | 600 m || 
|-id=395 bgcolor=#d6d6d6
| 467395 ||  || — || March 9, 2005 || Socorro || LINEAR || — || align=right | 2.3 km || 
|-id=396 bgcolor=#fefefe
| 467396 ||  || — || March 17, 2005 || Kitt Peak || Spacewatch || — || align=right data-sort-value="0.78" | 780 m || 
|-id=397 bgcolor=#d6d6d6
| 467397 ||  || — || April 2, 2005 || Mount Lemmon || Mount Lemmon Survey || — || align=right | 2.1 km || 
|-id=398 bgcolor=#d6d6d6
| 467398 ||  || — || April 2, 2005 || Catalina || CSS || — || align=right | 3.1 km || 
|-id=399 bgcolor=#d6d6d6
| 467399 ||  || — || April 4, 2005 || Mount Lemmon || Mount Lemmon Survey || — || align=right | 2.7 km || 
|-id=400 bgcolor=#fefefe
| 467400 ||  || — || March 17, 2005 || Kitt Peak || Spacewatch || — || align=right data-sort-value="0.80" | 800 m || 
|}

467401–467500 

|-bgcolor=#d6d6d6
| 467401 ||  || — || March 14, 2005 || Mount Lemmon || Mount Lemmon Survey || LIX || align=right | 2.5 km || 
|-id=402 bgcolor=#d6d6d6
| 467402 ||  || — || April 11, 2005 || Kitt Peak || M. W. Buie || — || align=right | 2.7 km || 
|-id=403 bgcolor=#d6d6d6
| 467403 ||  || — || March 14, 2005 || Mount Lemmon || Mount Lemmon Survey || — || align=right | 2.9 km || 
|-id=404 bgcolor=#d6d6d6
| 467404 ||  || — || May 3, 2005 || Kitt Peak || Spacewatch || — || align=right | 3.6 km || 
|-id=405 bgcolor=#d6d6d6
| 467405 ||  || — || May 4, 2005 || Kitt Peak || Spacewatch || — || align=right | 4.2 km || 
|-id=406 bgcolor=#fefefe
| 467406 ||  || — || May 9, 2005 || Anderson Mesa || LONEOS || — || align=right | 1.3 km || 
|-id=407 bgcolor=#d6d6d6
| 467407 ||  || — || May 3, 2005 || Kitt Peak || Spacewatch || — || align=right | 2.5 km || 
|-id=408 bgcolor=#fefefe
| 467408 ||  || — || May 11, 2005 || Kitt Peak || Spacewatch || — || align=right data-sort-value="0.70" | 700 m || 
|-id=409 bgcolor=#d6d6d6
| 467409 ||  || — || May 13, 2005 || Kitt Peak || Spacewatch || — || align=right | 2.8 km || 
|-id=410 bgcolor=#d6d6d6
| 467410 ||  || — || May 30, 2005 || Catalina || CSS || — || align=right | 2.9 km || 
|-id=411 bgcolor=#fefefe
| 467411 ||  || — || June 11, 2005 || Mayhill || A. Lowe || — || align=right | 1.1 km || 
|-id=412 bgcolor=#fefefe
| 467412 ||  || — || June 29, 2005 || Kitt Peak || Spacewatch || — || align=right data-sort-value="0.81" | 810 m || 
|-id=413 bgcolor=#fefefe
| 467413 ||  || — || July 2, 2005 || Kitt Peak || Spacewatch || — || align=right data-sort-value="0.82" | 820 m || 
|-id=414 bgcolor=#fefefe
| 467414 ||  || — || July 5, 2005 || Kitt Peak || Spacewatch || — || align=right data-sort-value="0.77" | 770 m || 
|-id=415 bgcolor=#E9E9E9
| 467415 ||  || — || September 29, 2005 || Kitt Peak || Spacewatch || MAR || align=right data-sort-value="0.74" | 740 m || 
|-id=416 bgcolor=#E9E9E9
| 467416 ||  || — || September 29, 2005 || Kitt Peak || Spacewatch || — || align=right data-sort-value="0.97" | 970 m || 
|-id=417 bgcolor=#E9E9E9
| 467417 ||  || — || October 1, 2005 || Catalina || CSS || — || align=right | 1.7 km || 
|-id=418 bgcolor=#E9E9E9
| 467418 ||  || — || October 24, 2005 || Kitt Peak || Spacewatch || — || align=right data-sort-value="0.74" | 740 m || 
|-id=419 bgcolor=#E9E9E9
| 467419 ||  || — || October 24, 2005 || Kitt Peak || Spacewatch || — || align=right data-sort-value="0.98" | 980 m || 
|-id=420 bgcolor=#E9E9E9
| 467420 ||  || — || October 24, 2005 || Kitt Peak || Spacewatch || — || align=right data-sort-value="0.90" | 900 m || 
|-id=421 bgcolor=#E9E9E9
| 467421 ||  || — || October 24, 2005 || Kitt Peak || Spacewatch || — || align=right | 1.4 km || 
|-id=422 bgcolor=#E9E9E9
| 467422 ||  || — || October 27, 2005 || Mount Lemmon || Mount Lemmon Survey || — || align=right data-sort-value="0.93" | 930 m || 
|-id=423 bgcolor=#E9E9E9
| 467423 ||  || — || October 25, 2005 || Kitt Peak || Spacewatch || — || align=right | 1.2 km || 
|-id=424 bgcolor=#E9E9E9
| 467424 ||  || — || October 26, 2005 || Kitt Peak || Spacewatch || — || align=right data-sort-value="0.92" | 920 m || 
|-id=425 bgcolor=#E9E9E9
| 467425 ||  || — || November 5, 2005 || Catalina || CSS || — || align=right | 1.9 km || 
|-id=426 bgcolor=#E9E9E9
| 467426 ||  || — || October 28, 2005 || Mount Lemmon || Mount Lemmon Survey || — || align=right | 1.1 km || 
|-id=427 bgcolor=#E9E9E9
| 467427 ||  || — || January 18, 2002 || Cima Ekar || ADAS || — || align=right | 2.4 km || 
|-id=428 bgcolor=#E9E9E9
| 467428 ||  || — || December 5, 2005 || Mount Lemmon || Mount Lemmon Survey || — || align=right | 1.7 km || 
|-id=429 bgcolor=#E9E9E9
| 467429 ||  || — || December 2, 2005 || Mount Lemmon || Mount Lemmon Survey || — || align=right | 1.6 km || 
|-id=430 bgcolor=#E9E9E9
| 467430 ||  || — || December 6, 2005 || Kitt Peak || Spacewatch || — || align=right | 1.9 km || 
|-id=431 bgcolor=#E9E9E9
| 467431 ||  || — || December 25, 2005 || Kitt Peak || Spacewatch || — || align=right | 1.9 km || 
|-id=432 bgcolor=#E9E9E9
| 467432 ||  || — || November 28, 2005 || Mount Lemmon || Mount Lemmon Survey || — || align=right data-sort-value="0.83" | 830 m || 
|-id=433 bgcolor=#E9E9E9
| 467433 ||  || — || December 25, 2005 || Kitt Peak || Spacewatch || EUN || align=right data-sort-value="0.93" | 930 m || 
|-id=434 bgcolor=#E9E9E9
| 467434 ||  || — || December 26, 2005 || Kitt Peak || Spacewatch || — || align=right | 2.0 km || 
|-id=435 bgcolor=#E9E9E9
| 467435 ||  || — || December 27, 2005 || Kitt Peak || Spacewatch || — || align=right | 2.1 km || 
|-id=436 bgcolor=#E9E9E9
| 467436 ||  || — || December 28, 2005 || Kitt Peak || Spacewatch || — || align=right | 1.4 km || 
|-id=437 bgcolor=#E9E9E9
| 467437 ||  || — || November 30, 2005 || Mount Lemmon || Mount Lemmon Survey || DOR || align=right | 1.6 km || 
|-id=438 bgcolor=#E9E9E9
| 467438 ||  || — || December 28, 2005 || Catalina || CSS || — || align=right | 2.4 km || 
|-id=439 bgcolor=#E9E9E9
| 467439 ||  || — || January 5, 2006 || Kitt Peak || Spacewatch || GEF || align=right | 1.1 km || 
|-id=440 bgcolor=#E9E9E9
| 467440 ||  || — || January 5, 2006 || Kitt Peak || Spacewatch || — || align=right | 1.3 km || 
|-id=441 bgcolor=#E9E9E9
| 467441 ||  || — || January 5, 2006 || Kitt Peak || Spacewatch || — || align=right | 1.7 km || 
|-id=442 bgcolor=#E9E9E9
| 467442 ||  || — || December 28, 2005 || Kitt Peak || Spacewatch || — || align=right | 1.8 km || 
|-id=443 bgcolor=#E9E9E9
| 467443 ||  || — || January 6, 2006 || Mount Lemmon || Mount Lemmon Survey || — || align=right | 2.0 km || 
|-id=444 bgcolor=#FA8072
| 467444 ||  || — || January 7, 2006 || Anderson Mesa || LONEOS || H || align=right data-sort-value="0.62" | 620 m || 
|-id=445 bgcolor=#fefefe
| 467445 ||  || — || January 23, 2006 || Kitt Peak || Spacewatch || — || align=right data-sort-value="0.68" | 680 m || 
|-id=446 bgcolor=#d6d6d6
| 467446 ||  || — || January 23, 2006 || Kitt Peak || Spacewatch || — || align=right | 2.4 km || 
|-id=447 bgcolor=#E9E9E9
| 467447 ||  || — || January 23, 2006 || Mount Lemmon || Mount Lemmon Survey || — || align=right | 1.7 km || 
|-id=448 bgcolor=#E9E9E9
| 467448 ||  || — || January 26, 2006 || Kitt Peak || Spacewatch || — || align=right | 2.1 km || 
|-id=449 bgcolor=#E9E9E9
| 467449 ||  || — || January 26, 2006 || Kitt Peak || Spacewatch || — || align=right | 2.0 km || 
|-id=450 bgcolor=#E9E9E9
| 467450 ||  || — || January 31, 2006 || Kitt Peak || Spacewatch || AGN || align=right | 1.2 km || 
|-id=451 bgcolor=#E9E9E9
| 467451 ||  || — || February 1, 2006 || Kitt Peak || Spacewatch || DOR || align=right | 2.5 km || 
|-id=452 bgcolor=#fefefe
| 467452 ||  || — || February 24, 2006 || Kitt Peak || Spacewatch || — || align=right data-sort-value="0.59" | 590 m || 
|-id=453 bgcolor=#fefefe
| 467453 ||  || — || February 27, 2006 || Kitt Peak || Spacewatch || — || align=right data-sort-value="0.65" | 650 m || 
|-id=454 bgcolor=#E9E9E9
| 467454 ||  || — || February 20, 2006 || Kitt Peak || Spacewatch || AST || align=right | 1.4 km || 
|-id=455 bgcolor=#d6d6d6
| 467455 ||  || — || March 26, 2006 || Mount Lemmon || Mount Lemmon Survey || — || align=right | 1.6 km || 
|-id=456 bgcolor=#fefefe
| 467456 ||  || — || April 20, 2006 || Kitt Peak || Spacewatch || — || align=right data-sort-value="0.47" | 470 m || 
|-id=457 bgcolor=#fefefe
| 467457 ||  || — || April 26, 2006 || Kitt Peak || Spacewatch || — || align=right data-sort-value="0.72" | 720 m || 
|-id=458 bgcolor=#fefefe
| 467458 ||  || — || April 30, 2006 || Kitt Peak || Spacewatch || — || align=right data-sort-value="0.57" | 570 m || 
|-id=459 bgcolor=#fefefe
| 467459 ||  || — || May 2, 2006 || Kitt Peak || Spacewatch || — || align=right data-sort-value="0.70" | 700 m || 
|-id=460 bgcolor=#FFC2E0
| 467460 ||  || — || May 11, 2006 || Catalina || CSS || ATEPHAcritical || align=right data-sort-value="0.51" | 510 m || 
|-id=461 bgcolor=#d6d6d6
| 467461 ||  || — || May 19, 2006 || Mount Lemmon || Mount Lemmon Survey || — || align=right | 4.4 km || 
|-id=462 bgcolor=#FA8072
| 467462 ||  || — || May 20, 2006 || Kitt Peak || Spacewatch || — || align=right data-sort-value="0.53" | 530 m || 
|-id=463 bgcolor=#fefefe
| 467463 ||  || — || May 21, 2006 || Kitt Peak || Spacewatch || — || align=right data-sort-value="0.52" | 520 m || 
|-id=464 bgcolor=#d6d6d6
| 467464 ||  || — || May 22, 2006 || Kitt Peak || Spacewatch || — || align=right | 1.9 km || 
|-id=465 bgcolor=#fefefe
| 467465 ||  || — || May 6, 2006 || Mount Lemmon || Mount Lemmon Survey || — || align=right data-sort-value="0.71" | 710 m || 
|-id=466 bgcolor=#d6d6d6
| 467466 ||  || — || May 4, 2006 || Kitt Peak || Spacewatch || NAE || align=right | 2.0 km || 
|-id=467 bgcolor=#d6d6d6
| 467467 ||  || — || May 7, 2006 || Mount Lemmon || Mount Lemmon Survey || — || align=right | 2.2 km || 
|-id=468 bgcolor=#d6d6d6
| 467468 ||  || — || August 15, 2006 || Palomar || NEAT || — || align=right | 3.2 km || 
|-id=469 bgcolor=#fefefe
| 467469 ||  || — || July 28, 2006 || Siding Spring || SSS || — || align=right | 1.1 km || 
|-id=470 bgcolor=#fefefe
| 467470 ||  || — || August 16, 2006 || Siding Spring || SSS || — || align=right data-sort-value="0.97" | 970 m || 
|-id=471 bgcolor=#FA8072
| 467471 ||  || — || August 24, 2006 || Palomar || NEAT || — || align=right data-sort-value="0.59" | 590 m || 
|-id=472 bgcolor=#fefefe
| 467472 ||  || — || August 27, 2006 || Anderson Mesa || LONEOS || NYS || align=right data-sort-value="0.69" | 690 m || 
|-id=473 bgcolor=#fefefe
| 467473 ||  || — || August 27, 2006 || Kitt Peak || Spacewatch || V || align=right data-sort-value="0.68" | 680 m || 
|-id=474 bgcolor=#d6d6d6
| 467474 ||  || — || August 29, 2006 || Anderson Mesa || LONEOS || — || align=right | 3.5 km || 
|-id=475 bgcolor=#FFC2E0
| 467475 ||  || — || September 15, 2006 || Socorro || LINEAR || AMO || align=right data-sort-value="0.61" | 610 m || 
|-id=476 bgcolor=#d6d6d6
| 467476 ||  || — || September 15, 2006 || Kitt Peak || Spacewatch || VER || align=right | 2.3 km || 
|-id=477 bgcolor=#fefefe
| 467477 ||  || — || August 19, 2006 || Kitt Peak || Spacewatch || — || align=right data-sort-value="0.70" | 700 m || 
|-id=478 bgcolor=#fefefe
| 467478 ||  || — || August 21, 2006 || Kitt Peak || Spacewatch || — || align=right data-sort-value="0.55" | 550 m || 
|-id=479 bgcolor=#d6d6d6
| 467479 ||  || — || September 20, 2006 || Catalina || CSS || — || align=right | 4.0 km || 
|-id=480 bgcolor=#fefefe
| 467480 ||  || — || September 19, 2006 || Kitt Peak || Spacewatch || NYS || align=right data-sort-value="0.52" | 520 m || 
|-id=481 bgcolor=#d6d6d6
| 467481 ||  || — || September 19, 2006 || Kitt Peak || Spacewatch || — || align=right | 2.1 km || 
|-id=482 bgcolor=#fefefe
| 467482 ||  || — || September 25, 2006 || Mount Lemmon || Mount Lemmon Survey || — || align=right data-sort-value="0.74" | 740 m || 
|-id=483 bgcolor=#fefefe
| 467483 ||  || — || September 27, 2006 || Kitt Peak || Spacewatch || — || align=right data-sort-value="0.78" | 780 m || 
|-id=484 bgcolor=#fefefe
| 467484 ||  || — || September 17, 2006 || Kitt Peak || Spacewatch || NYS || align=right data-sort-value="0.64" | 640 m || 
|-id=485 bgcolor=#d6d6d6
| 467485 ||  || — || September 27, 2006 || Kitt Peak || Spacewatch || — || align=right | 2.9 km || 
|-id=486 bgcolor=#E9E9E9
| 467486 ||  || — || September 30, 2006 || Catalina || CSS || — || align=right | 1.5 km || 
|-id=487 bgcolor=#d6d6d6
| 467487 ||  || — || September 16, 2006 || Catalina || CSS || — || align=right | 3.5 km || 
|-id=488 bgcolor=#fefefe
| 467488 ||  || — || October 12, 2006 || Kitt Peak || Spacewatch || — || align=right data-sort-value="0.68" | 680 m || 
|-id=489 bgcolor=#fefefe
| 467489 ||  || — || October 13, 2006 || Kitt Peak || Spacewatch || ERI || align=right | 1.7 km || 
|-id=490 bgcolor=#d6d6d6
| 467490 ||  || — || October 13, 2006 || Kitt Peak || Spacewatch || — || align=right | 3.2 km || 
|-id=491 bgcolor=#fefefe
| 467491 ||  || — || October 23, 2006 || Eskridge || Farpoint Obs. || — || align=right data-sort-value="0.68" | 680 m || 
|-id=492 bgcolor=#fefefe
| 467492 ||  || — || September 18, 2006 || Kitt Peak || Spacewatch || — || align=right data-sort-value="0.56" | 560 m || 
|-id=493 bgcolor=#fefefe
| 467493 ||  || — || October 2, 2006 || Mount Lemmon || Mount Lemmon Survey || — || align=right data-sort-value="0.60" | 600 m || 
|-id=494 bgcolor=#fefefe
| 467494 ||  || — || October 2, 2006 || Mount Lemmon || Mount Lemmon Survey || — || align=right data-sort-value="0.79" | 790 m || 
|-id=495 bgcolor=#fefefe
| 467495 ||  || — || September 18, 2006 || Kitt Peak || Spacewatch || — || align=right data-sort-value="0.75" | 750 m || 
|-id=496 bgcolor=#FA8072
| 467496 ||  || — || September 27, 2006 || Mount Lemmon || Mount Lemmon Survey || — || align=right data-sort-value="0.68" | 680 m || 
|-id=497 bgcolor=#E9E9E9
| 467497 ||  || — || October 20, 2006 || Mount Lemmon || Mount Lemmon Survey || — || align=right data-sort-value="0.76" | 760 m || 
|-id=498 bgcolor=#E9E9E9
| 467498 ||  || — || November 19, 2006 || Kitt Peak || Spacewatch || — || align=right data-sort-value="0.79" | 790 m || 
|-id=499 bgcolor=#fefefe
| 467499 ||  || — || October 21, 2006 || Mount Lemmon || Mount Lemmon Survey || — || align=right data-sort-value="0.70" | 700 m || 
|-id=500 bgcolor=#d6d6d6
| 467500 ||  || — || November 16, 2006 || Mount Lemmon || Mount Lemmon Survey || — || align=right | 4.5 km || 
|}

467501–467600 

|-bgcolor=#E9E9E9
| 467501 ||  || — || December 11, 2006 || Kitt Peak || Spacewatch || — || align=right | 1.3 km || 
|-id=502 bgcolor=#E9E9E9
| 467502 ||  || — || January 17, 2007 || Kitt Peak || Spacewatch || — || align=right data-sort-value="0.97" | 970 m || 
|-id=503 bgcolor=#E9E9E9
| 467503 ||  || — || January 24, 2007 || Catalina || CSS || — || align=right data-sort-value="0.85" | 850 m || 
|-id=504 bgcolor=#E9E9E9
| 467504 ||  || — || January 24, 2007 || Mount Lemmon || Mount Lemmon Survey || — || align=right data-sort-value="0.79" | 790 m || 
|-id=505 bgcolor=#E9E9E9
| 467505 ||  || — || January 17, 2007 || Kitt Peak || Spacewatch || — || align=right data-sort-value="0.81" | 810 m || 
|-id=506 bgcolor=#E9E9E9
| 467506 ||  || — || January 28, 2007 || Kitt Peak || Spacewatch || — || align=right | 1.7 km || 
|-id=507 bgcolor=#E9E9E9
| 467507 ||  || — || November 15, 2006 || Mount Lemmon || Mount Lemmon Survey || — || align=right data-sort-value="0.99" | 990 m || 
|-id=508 bgcolor=#E9E9E9
| 467508 ||  || — || February 10, 2007 || Mount Lemmon || Mount Lemmon Survey || — || align=right | 1.3 km || 
|-id=509 bgcolor=#E9E9E9
| 467509 ||  || — || February 13, 2007 || Črni Vrh || Črni Vrh || — || align=right | 2.0 km || 
|-id=510 bgcolor=#E9E9E9
| 467510 ||  || — || February 17, 2007 || Kitt Peak || Spacewatch || — || align=right | 1.5 km || 
|-id=511 bgcolor=#E9E9E9
| 467511 ||  || — || February 17, 2007 || Kitt Peak || Spacewatch || — || align=right | 1.5 km || 
|-id=512 bgcolor=#E9E9E9
| 467512 ||  || — || March 10, 2007 || Kitt Peak || Spacewatch || — || align=right | 2.7 km || 
|-id=513 bgcolor=#E9E9E9
| 467513 ||  || — || August 7, 2004 || Campo Imperatore || CINEOS || MAR || align=right data-sort-value="0.95" | 950 m || 
|-id=514 bgcolor=#E9E9E9
| 467514 ||  || — || March 12, 2007 || Mount Lemmon || Mount Lemmon Survey || — || align=right | 1.0 km || 
|-id=515 bgcolor=#E9E9E9
| 467515 ||  || — || March 14, 2007 || Kitt Peak || Spacewatch || — || align=right | 1.3 km || 
|-id=516 bgcolor=#E9E9E9
| 467516 ||  || — || March 11, 2007 || Mount Lemmon || Mount Lemmon Survey || — || align=right | 1.2 km || 
|-id=517 bgcolor=#E9E9E9
| 467517 ||  || — || March 13, 2007 || Catalina || CSS || — || align=right | 1.4 km || 
|-id=518 bgcolor=#E9E9E9
| 467518 ||  || — || April 10, 2007 || Altschwendt || W. Ries || — || align=right | 1.7 km || 
|-id=519 bgcolor=#E9E9E9
| 467519 ||  || — || March 14, 2007 || Kitt Peak || Spacewatch || — || align=right | 2.1 km || 
|-id=520 bgcolor=#E9E9E9
| 467520 ||  || — || March 12, 2007 || Catalina || CSS || — || align=right | 3.2 km || 
|-id=521 bgcolor=#E9E9E9
| 467521 ||  || — || April 11, 2007 || Kitt Peak || Spacewatch || — || align=right | 1.8 km || 
|-id=522 bgcolor=#E9E9E9
| 467522 ||  || — || March 16, 2007 || Mount Lemmon || Mount Lemmon Survey || NEM || align=right | 2.0 km || 
|-id=523 bgcolor=#E9E9E9
| 467523 ||  || — || March 11, 2007 || Kitt Peak || Spacewatch || — || align=right | 1.5 km || 
|-id=524 bgcolor=#d6d6d6
| 467524 ||  || — || April 25, 2007 || Kitt Peak || Spacewatch || — || align=right | 2.7 km || 
|-id=525 bgcolor=#E9E9E9
| 467525 ||  || — || March 11, 2007 || Mount Lemmon || Mount Lemmon Survey || — || align=right | 2.1 km || 
|-id=526 bgcolor=#E9E9E9
| 467526 ||  || — || May 19, 2007 || Catalina || CSS || — || align=right | 3.4 km || 
|-id=527 bgcolor=#FFC2E0
| 467527 ||  || — || June 13, 2007 || Catalina || CSS || AMO || align=right data-sort-value="0.45" | 450 m || 
|-id=528 bgcolor=#d6d6d6
| 467528 ||  || — || June 17, 2007 || Kitt Peak || Spacewatch || — || align=right | 2.7 km || 
|-id=529 bgcolor=#d6d6d6
| 467529 ||  || — || August 15, 2007 || Črni Vrh || Črni Vrh || — || align=right | 2.8 km || 
|-id=530 bgcolor=#fefefe
| 467530 ||  || — || September 2, 2007 || Mount Lemmon || Mount Lemmon Survey || — || align=right data-sort-value="0.60" | 600 m || 
|-id=531 bgcolor=#d6d6d6
| 467531 ||  || — || September 9, 2007 || Kitt Peak || Spacewatch || EOS || align=right | 1.8 km || 
|-id=532 bgcolor=#d6d6d6
| 467532 ||  || — || September 10, 2007 || Kitt Peak || Spacewatch || — || align=right | 3.5 km || 
|-id=533 bgcolor=#d6d6d6
| 467533 ||  || — || September 11, 2007 || Kitt Peak || Spacewatch || — || align=right | 2.5 km || 
|-id=534 bgcolor=#d6d6d6
| 467534 ||  || — || September 10, 2007 || Kitt Peak || Spacewatch || — || align=right | 3.9 km || 
|-id=535 bgcolor=#d6d6d6
| 467535 ||  || — || September 10, 2007 || Kitt Peak || Spacewatch || — || align=right | 2.1 km || 
|-id=536 bgcolor=#d6d6d6
| 467536 ||  || — || September 12, 2007 || Mount Lemmon || Mount Lemmon Survey || — || align=right | 2.7 km || 
|-id=537 bgcolor=#d6d6d6
| 467537 ||  || — || September 15, 2007 || Mount Lemmon || Mount Lemmon Survey || ELF || align=right | 3.8 km || 
|-id=538 bgcolor=#fefefe
| 467538 ||  || — || September 9, 2007 || Anderson Mesa || LONEOS || — || align=right data-sort-value="0.77" | 770 m || 
|-id=539 bgcolor=#d6d6d6
| 467539 ||  || — || September 14, 2007 || Mount Lemmon || Mount Lemmon Survey || — || align=right | 2.5 km || 
|-id=540 bgcolor=#E9E9E9
| 467540 ||  || — || September 11, 2007 || Catalina || CSS || — || align=right | 3.3 km || 
|-id=541 bgcolor=#fefefe
| 467541 ||  || — || September 13, 2007 || Mount Lemmon || Mount Lemmon Survey || — || align=right data-sort-value="0.70" | 700 m || 
|-id=542 bgcolor=#fefefe
| 467542 ||  || — || October 8, 2007 || Calvin-Rehoboth || Calvin–Rehoboth Obs. || — || align=right data-sort-value="0.58" | 580 m || 
|-id=543 bgcolor=#d6d6d6
| 467543 ||  || — || October 4, 2007 || Kitt Peak || Spacewatch || — || align=right | 3.0 km || 
|-id=544 bgcolor=#d6d6d6
| 467544 ||  || — || October 6, 2007 || Kitt Peak || Spacewatch || — || align=right | 2.9 km || 
|-id=545 bgcolor=#fefefe
| 467545 ||  || — || October 6, 2007 || Kitt Peak || Spacewatch || — || align=right data-sort-value="0.70" | 700 m || 
|-id=546 bgcolor=#d6d6d6
| 467546 ||  || — || October 4, 2007 || Kitt Peak || Spacewatch || — || align=right | 3.0 km || 
|-id=547 bgcolor=#fefefe
| 467547 ||  || — || October 4, 2007 || Kitt Peak || Spacewatch || — || align=right data-sort-value="0.66" | 660 m || 
|-id=548 bgcolor=#fefefe
| 467548 ||  || — || October 7, 2007 || Mount Lemmon || Mount Lemmon Survey || — || align=right data-sort-value="0.78" | 780 m || 
|-id=549 bgcolor=#d6d6d6
| 467549 ||  || — || October 8, 2007 || Mount Lemmon || Mount Lemmon Survey || — || align=right | 3.7 km || 
|-id=550 bgcolor=#FA8072
| 467550 ||  || — || September 8, 2007 || Mount Lemmon || Mount Lemmon Survey || — || align=right data-sort-value="0.68" | 680 m || 
|-id=551 bgcolor=#d6d6d6
| 467551 ||  || — || October 8, 2007 || Mount Lemmon || Mount Lemmon Survey || — || align=right | 3.4 km || 
|-id=552 bgcolor=#d6d6d6
| 467552 ||  || — || October 8, 2007 || Mount Lemmon || Mount Lemmon Survey || — || align=right | 4.1 km || 
|-id=553 bgcolor=#E9E9E9
| 467553 ||  || — || September 18, 2007 || Catalina || CSS || — || align=right | 2.6 km || 
|-id=554 bgcolor=#d6d6d6
| 467554 ||  || — || October 9, 2007 || Mount Lemmon || Mount Lemmon Survey || — || align=right | 3.8 km || 
|-id=555 bgcolor=#d6d6d6
| 467555 ||  || — || September 10, 2007 || Mount Lemmon || Mount Lemmon Survey || — || align=right | 2.6 km || 
|-id=556 bgcolor=#fefefe
| 467556 ||  || — || October 9, 2007 || Socorro || LINEAR || — || align=right data-sort-value="0.68" | 680 m || 
|-id=557 bgcolor=#fefefe
| 467557 ||  || — || October 8, 2007 || Catalina || CSS || — || align=right data-sort-value="0.81" | 810 m || 
|-id=558 bgcolor=#fefefe
| 467558 ||  || — || October 4, 2007 || Kitt Peak || Spacewatch || — || align=right data-sort-value="0.67" | 670 m || 
|-id=559 bgcolor=#d6d6d6
| 467559 ||  || — || October 7, 2007 || Mount Lemmon || Mount Lemmon Survey || EOS || align=right | 2.0 km || 
|-id=560 bgcolor=#d6d6d6
| 467560 ||  || — || October 7, 2007 || Mount Lemmon || Mount Lemmon Survey || — || align=right | 2.6 km || 
|-id=561 bgcolor=#d6d6d6
| 467561 ||  || — || October 7, 2007 || Kitt Peak || Spacewatch ||  || align=right | 3.8 km || 
|-id=562 bgcolor=#d6d6d6
| 467562 ||  || — || September 10, 2007 || Mount Lemmon || Mount Lemmon Survey || — || align=right | 3.2 km || 
|-id=563 bgcolor=#d6d6d6
| 467563 ||  || — || October 7, 2007 || Kitt Peak || Spacewatch || — || align=right | 3.4 km || 
|-id=564 bgcolor=#d6d6d6
| 467564 ||  || — || October 8, 2007 || Kitt Peak || Spacewatch || — || align=right | 2.6 km || 
|-id=565 bgcolor=#fefefe
| 467565 ||  || — || September 12, 2007 || Catalina || CSS || — || align=right data-sort-value="0.71" | 710 m || 
|-id=566 bgcolor=#fefefe
| 467566 ||  || — || October 9, 2007 || Kitt Peak || Spacewatch || — || align=right data-sort-value="0.67" | 670 m || 
|-id=567 bgcolor=#d6d6d6
| 467567 ||  || — || October 10, 2007 || Mount Lemmon || Mount Lemmon Survey || — || align=right | 3.3 km || 
|-id=568 bgcolor=#d6d6d6
| 467568 ||  || — || September 14, 2007 || Mount Lemmon || Mount Lemmon Survey || — || align=right | 2.9 km || 
|-id=569 bgcolor=#fefefe
| 467569 ||  || — || October 13, 2007 || Mount Lemmon || Mount Lemmon Survey || — || align=right data-sort-value="0.81" | 810 m || 
|-id=570 bgcolor=#d6d6d6
| 467570 ||  || — || October 11, 2007 || Kitt Peak || Spacewatch ||  || align=right | 2.6 km || 
|-id=571 bgcolor=#d6d6d6
| 467571 ||  || — || October 10, 2007 || Catalina || CSS || — || align=right | 2.9 km || 
|-id=572 bgcolor=#d6d6d6
| 467572 ||  || — || October 6, 2007 || Kitt Peak || Spacewatch || — || align=right | 3.4 km || 
|-id=573 bgcolor=#d6d6d6
| 467573 ||  || — || October 15, 2007 || Mount Lemmon || Mount Lemmon Survey || EOS || align=right | 2.2 km || 
|-id=574 bgcolor=#fefefe
| 467574 ||  || — || October 7, 2007 || Mount Lemmon || Mount Lemmon Survey || — || align=right data-sort-value="0.69" | 690 m || 
|-id=575 bgcolor=#d6d6d6
| 467575 ||  || — || October 10, 2007 || Kitt Peak || Spacewatch || — || align=right | 3.3 km || 
|-id=576 bgcolor=#fefefe
| 467576 ||  || — || October 14, 2007 || Mount Lemmon || Mount Lemmon Survey || — || align=right data-sort-value="0.90" | 900 m || 
|-id=577 bgcolor=#d6d6d6
| 467577 ||  || — || October 3, 2002 || Campo Imperatore || CINEOS || — || align=right | 2.5 km || 
|-id=578 bgcolor=#fefefe
| 467578 ||  || — || October 9, 2007 || Kitt Peak || Spacewatch || — || align=right data-sort-value="0.78" | 780 m || 
|-id=579 bgcolor=#d6d6d6
| 467579 ||  || — || October 18, 2007 || Mount Lemmon || Mount Lemmon Survey || EOS || align=right | 1.9 km || 
|-id=580 bgcolor=#fefefe
| 467580 ||  || — || October 16, 2007 || Catalina || CSS || — || align=right | 1.4 km || 
|-id=581 bgcolor=#fefefe
| 467581 ||  || — || October 24, 2007 || Mount Lemmon || Mount Lemmon Survey || — || align=right | 1.0 km || 
|-id=582 bgcolor=#fefefe
| 467582 ||  || — || October 31, 2007 || Mount Lemmon || Mount Lemmon Survey || — || align=right data-sort-value="0.66" | 660 m || 
|-id=583 bgcolor=#fefefe
| 467583 ||  || — || October 30, 2007 || Kitt Peak || Spacewatch || — || align=right data-sort-value="0.64" | 640 m || 
|-id=584 bgcolor=#d6d6d6
| 467584 ||  || — || October 14, 2007 || Mount Lemmon || Mount Lemmon Survey || — || align=right | 3.7 km || 
|-id=585 bgcolor=#fefefe
| 467585 ||  || — || October 30, 2007 || Kitt Peak || Spacewatch || — || align=right data-sort-value="0.68" | 680 m || 
|-id=586 bgcolor=#d6d6d6
| 467586 ||  || — || October 30, 2007 || Mount Lemmon || Mount Lemmon Survey || — || align=right | 2.4 km || 
|-id=587 bgcolor=#d6d6d6
| 467587 ||  || — || October 18, 2007 || Kitt Peak || Spacewatch || — || align=right | 2.7 km || 
|-id=588 bgcolor=#d6d6d6
| 467588 ||  || — || October 21, 2007 || Mount Lemmon || Mount Lemmon Survey || — || align=right | 3.1 km || 
|-id=589 bgcolor=#fefefe
| 467589 ||  || — || October 20, 2007 || Mount Lemmon || Mount Lemmon Survey || — || align=right data-sort-value="0.73" | 730 m || 
|-id=590 bgcolor=#d6d6d6
| 467590 ||  || — || October 8, 2007 || Catalina || CSS || — || align=right | 3.6 km || 
|-id=591 bgcolor=#d6d6d6
| 467591 ||  || — || October 16, 2007 || Mount Lemmon || Mount Lemmon Survey || — || align=right | 3.6 km || 
|-id=592 bgcolor=#d6d6d6
| 467592 ||  || — || October 19, 2007 || Mount Lemmon || Mount Lemmon Survey || — || align=right | 2.9 km || 
|-id=593 bgcolor=#d6d6d6
| 467593 ||  || — || October 4, 2007 || Kitt Peak || Spacewatch || — || align=right | 2.5 km || 
|-id=594 bgcolor=#fefefe
| 467594 ||  || — || November 4, 2007 || Mount Lemmon || Mount Lemmon Survey || — || align=right data-sort-value="0.59" | 590 m || 
|-id=595 bgcolor=#d6d6d6
| 467595 ||  || — || November 5, 2007 || Kitt Peak || Spacewatch || — || align=right | 3.2 km || 
|-id=596 bgcolor=#d6d6d6
| 467596 ||  || — || October 20, 2007 || Mount Lemmon || Mount Lemmon Survey || — || align=right | 2.8 km || 
|-id=597 bgcolor=#d6d6d6
| 467597 ||  || — || September 15, 2007 || Mount Lemmon || Mount Lemmon Survey || EOS || align=right | 2.2 km || 
|-id=598 bgcolor=#d6d6d6
| 467598 ||  || — || November 11, 2007 || Mount Lemmon || Mount Lemmon Survey || — || align=right | 3.2 km || 
|-id=599 bgcolor=#d6d6d6
| 467599 ||  || — || November 9, 2007 || Catalina || CSS || — || align=right | 3.5 km || 
|-id=600 bgcolor=#d6d6d6
| 467600 ||  || — || November 5, 2007 || XuYi || PMO NEO || — || align=right | 2.9 km || 
|}

467601–467700 

|-bgcolor=#fefefe
| 467601 ||  || — || November 7, 2007 || Kitt Peak || Spacewatch || — || align=right data-sort-value="0.75" | 750 m || 
|-id=602 bgcolor=#fefefe
| 467602 ||  || — || November 12, 2007 || Catalina || CSS || — || align=right data-sort-value="0.86" | 860 m || 
|-id=603 bgcolor=#d6d6d6
| 467603 ||  || — || October 15, 2007 || Mount Lemmon || Mount Lemmon Survey || — || align=right | 2.7 km || 
|-id=604 bgcolor=#fefefe
| 467604 ||  || — || November 1, 2007 || Kitt Peak || Spacewatch || — || align=right data-sort-value="0.64" | 640 m || 
|-id=605 bgcolor=#d6d6d6
| 467605 ||  || — || November 11, 2007 || Catalina || CSS || Tj (2.97) || align=right | 4.4 km || 
|-id=606 bgcolor=#fefefe
| 467606 ||  || — || November 2, 2007 || Kitt Peak || Spacewatch || NYS || align=right data-sort-value="0.65" | 650 m || 
|-id=607 bgcolor=#fefefe
| 467607 ||  || — || November 3, 2007 || Mount Lemmon || Mount Lemmon Survey || — || align=right data-sort-value="0.79" | 790 m || 
|-id=608 bgcolor=#fefefe
| 467608 ||  || — || October 20, 2007 || Mount Lemmon || Mount Lemmon Survey || H || align=right data-sort-value="0.57" | 570 m || 
|-id=609 bgcolor=#FFC2E0
| 467609 ||  || — || January 11, 2008 || Kitt Peak || Spacewatch || APO || align=right data-sort-value="0.45" | 450 m || 
|-id=610 bgcolor=#fefefe
| 467610 ||  || — || January 10, 2008 || Mount Lemmon || Mount Lemmon Survey || — || align=right data-sort-value="0.63" | 630 m || 
|-id=611 bgcolor=#fefefe
| 467611 ||  || — || January 12, 2008 || Kitt Peak || Spacewatch || — || align=right data-sort-value="0.75" | 750 m || 
|-id=612 bgcolor=#fefefe
| 467612 ||  || — || January 10, 2008 || Kitt Peak || Spacewatch || — || align=right data-sort-value="0.62" | 620 m || 
|-id=613 bgcolor=#d6d6d6
| 467613 ||  || — || January 12, 2008 || Kitt Peak || Spacewatch || 7:4 || align=right | 3.7 km || 
|-id=614 bgcolor=#fefefe
| 467614 ||  || — || February 3, 2008 || Kitt Peak || Spacewatch || MAS || align=right data-sort-value="0.61" | 610 m || 
|-id=615 bgcolor=#fefefe
| 467615 ||  || — || December 20, 2007 || Kitt Peak || Spacewatch || — || align=right data-sort-value="0.69" | 690 m || 
|-id=616 bgcolor=#fefefe
| 467616 ||  || — || February 8, 2008 || Kitt Peak || Spacewatch || — || align=right data-sort-value="0.74" | 740 m || 
|-id=617 bgcolor=#fefefe
| 467617 ||  || — || January 30, 2008 || Mount Lemmon || Mount Lemmon Survey || NYS || align=right data-sort-value="0.52" | 520 m || 
|-id=618 bgcolor=#fefefe
| 467618 ||  || — || January 15, 2008 || Kitt Peak || Spacewatch || — || align=right data-sort-value="0.76" | 760 m || 
|-id=619 bgcolor=#fefefe
| 467619 ||  || — || January 1, 2008 || Kitt Peak || Spacewatch || — || align=right data-sort-value="0.90" | 900 m || 
|-id=620 bgcolor=#fefefe
| 467620 ||  || — || February 18, 2008 || Mount Lemmon || Mount Lemmon Survey || NYS || align=right data-sort-value="0.73" | 730 m || 
|-id=621 bgcolor=#fefefe
| 467621 ||  || — || January 11, 2008 || Mount Lemmon || Mount Lemmon Survey || — || align=right data-sort-value="0.94" | 940 m || 
|-id=622 bgcolor=#fefefe
| 467622 ||  || — || March 4, 2008 || Kitt Peak || Spacewatch || — || align=right data-sort-value="0.83" | 830 m || 
|-id=623 bgcolor=#fefefe
| 467623 ||  || — || March 26, 2008 || Kitt Peak || Spacewatch || V || align=right data-sort-value="0.58" | 580 m || 
|-id=624 bgcolor=#fefefe
| 467624 ||  || — || March 1, 2008 || Kitt Peak || Spacewatch || — || align=right data-sort-value="0.65" | 650 m || 
|-id=625 bgcolor=#E9E9E9
| 467625 ||  || — || March 29, 2008 || Kitt Peak || Spacewatch || — || align=right | 1.1 km || 
|-id=626 bgcolor=#E9E9E9
| 467626 ||  || — || April 5, 2008 || Kitt Peak || Spacewatch || — || align=right data-sort-value="0.74" | 740 m || 
|-id=627 bgcolor=#E9E9E9
| 467627 ||  || — || April 26, 2008 || Kitt Peak || Spacewatch || (194) || align=right | 2.8 km || 
|-id=628 bgcolor=#E9E9E9
| 467628 ||  || — || May 31, 2008 || Mount Lemmon || Mount Lemmon Survey || — || align=right | 1.3 km || 
|-id=629 bgcolor=#E9E9E9
| 467629 ||  || — || November 17, 2006 || Kitt Peak || Spacewatch || EUN || align=right | 1.3 km || 
|-id=630 bgcolor=#E9E9E9
| 467630 ||  || — || June 3, 2008 || Mount Lemmon || Mount Lemmon Survey || (5) || align=right data-sort-value="0.75" | 750 m || 
|-id=631 bgcolor=#E9E9E9
| 467631 ||  || — || August 13, 2008 || La Sagra || OAM Obs. || (1547) || align=right | 1.8 km || 
|-id=632 bgcolor=#E9E9E9
| 467632 ||  || — || August 30, 2008 || La Sagra || OAM Obs. || — || align=right | 1.6 km || 
|-id=633 bgcolor=#E9E9E9
| 467633 ||  || — || August 26, 2008 || Siding Spring || SSS || — || align=right | 1.6 km || 
|-id=634 bgcolor=#E9E9E9
| 467634 ||  || — || September 2, 2008 || Kitt Peak || Spacewatch || — || align=right | 2.0 km || 
|-id=635 bgcolor=#C2FFFF
| 467635 ||  || — || September 3, 2008 || Kitt Peak || Spacewatch || L4 || align=right | 7.1 km || 
|-id=636 bgcolor=#E9E9E9
| 467636 ||  || — || August 20, 2008 || Kitt Peak || Spacewatch || — || align=right | 1.8 km || 
|-id=637 bgcolor=#E9E9E9
| 467637 ||  || — || September 4, 2008 || Kitt Peak || Spacewatch || — || align=right | 1.9 km || 
|-id=638 bgcolor=#E9E9E9
| 467638 ||  || — || September 7, 2008 || Mount Lemmon || Mount Lemmon Survey || — || align=right | 1.6 km || 
|-id=639 bgcolor=#E9E9E9
| 467639 ||  || — || September 7, 2008 || Mount Lemmon || Mount Lemmon Survey || HOF || align=right | 2.3 km || 
|-id=640 bgcolor=#d6d6d6
| 467640 ||  || — || September 9, 2008 || Kitt Peak || Spacewatch || — || align=right | 1.9 km || 
|-id=641 bgcolor=#d6d6d6
| 467641 ||  || — || September 4, 2008 || Kitt Peak || Spacewatch || KOR || align=right | 1.3 km || 
|-id=642 bgcolor=#E9E9E9
| 467642 ||  || — || September 4, 2008 || Kitt Peak || Spacewatch || — || align=right | 2.3 km || 
|-id=643 bgcolor=#E9E9E9
| 467643 ||  || — || September 20, 2008 || Mount Lemmon || Mount Lemmon Survey || EUN || align=right | 1.0 km || 
|-id=644 bgcolor=#C2FFFF
| 467644 ||  || — || September 21, 2008 || Kitt Peak || Spacewatch || L4 || align=right | 8.8 km || 
|-id=645 bgcolor=#E9E9E9
| 467645 ||  || — || September 25, 2008 || Kitt Peak || Spacewatch || — || align=right | 1.8 km || 
|-id=646 bgcolor=#E9E9E9
| 467646 ||  || — || September 25, 2008 || Kitt Peak || Spacewatch || AGN || align=right | 1.2 km || 
|-id=647 bgcolor=#E9E9E9
| 467647 ||  || — || September 25, 2008 || Kitt Peak || Spacewatch || — || align=right | 2.0 km || 
|-id=648 bgcolor=#E9E9E9
| 467648 ||  || — || September 7, 2008 || Socorro || LINEAR || — || align=right | 3.3 km || 
|-id=649 bgcolor=#E9E9E9
| 467649 ||  || — || September 6, 2008 || Siding Spring || SSS || — || align=right | 3.3 km || 
|-id=650 bgcolor=#E9E9E9
| 467650 ||  || — || September 29, 2008 || Catalina || CSS || DOR || align=right | 3.3 km || 
|-id=651 bgcolor=#d6d6d6
| 467651 ||  || — || September 25, 2008 || Kitt Peak || Spacewatch || — || align=right | 2.5 km || 
|-id=652 bgcolor=#E9E9E9
| 467652 ||  || — || September 24, 2008 || Catalina || CSS || — || align=right | 2.9 km || 
|-id=653 bgcolor=#E9E9E9
| 467653 ||  || — || July 29, 2008 || Kitt Peak || Spacewatch || ADE || align=right | 2.6 km || 
|-id=654 bgcolor=#d6d6d6
| 467654 ||  || — || October 6, 2008 || Kitt Peak || Spacewatch || KOR || align=right | 1.1 km || 
|-id=655 bgcolor=#E9E9E9
| 467655 ||  || — || October 1, 2008 || Mount Lemmon || Mount Lemmon Survey || — || align=right | 2.5 km || 
|-id=656 bgcolor=#E9E9E9
| 467656 ||  || — || October 8, 2008 || Mount Lemmon || Mount Lemmon Survey || — || align=right | 1.3 km || 
|-id=657 bgcolor=#E9E9E9
| 467657 ||  || — || October 9, 2008 || Mount Lemmon || Mount Lemmon Survey || AGN || align=right data-sort-value="0.95" | 950 m || 
|-id=658 bgcolor=#E9E9E9
| 467658 ||  || — || September 4, 2008 || Kitt Peak || Spacewatch || — || align=right | 2.3 km || 
|-id=659 bgcolor=#E9E9E9
| 467659 ||  || — || October 1, 2008 || Catalina || CSS || DOR || align=right | 2.4 km || 
|-id=660 bgcolor=#d6d6d6
| 467660 ||  || — || April 2, 2006 || Kitt Peak || Spacewatch || — || align=right | 2.2 km || 
|-id=661 bgcolor=#d6d6d6
| 467661 ||  || — || October 1, 2008 || Kitt Peak || Spacewatch || KOR || align=right | 1.1 km || 
|-id=662 bgcolor=#E9E9E9
| 467662 ||  || — || October 8, 2008 || Kitt Peak || Spacewatch || — || align=right | 1.8 km || 
|-id=663 bgcolor=#d6d6d6
| 467663 ||  || — || September 9, 2008 || Mount Lemmon || Mount Lemmon Survey || — || align=right | 3.1 km || 
|-id=664 bgcolor=#d6d6d6
| 467664 ||  || — || October 21, 2008 || Kitt Peak || Spacewatch || EOS || align=right | 2.1 km || 
|-id=665 bgcolor=#FA8072
| 467665 ||  || — || October 27, 2008 || Socorro || LINEAR || H || align=right data-sort-value="0.90" | 900 m || 
|-id=666 bgcolor=#E9E9E9
| 467666 ||  || — || September 29, 2008 || Catalina || CSS || JUN || align=right | 1.1 km || 
|-id=667 bgcolor=#E9E9E9
| 467667 ||  || — || September 23, 2008 || Kitt Peak || Spacewatch || JUN || align=right | 1.0 km || 
|-id=668 bgcolor=#E9E9E9
| 467668 ||  || — || September 3, 2008 || Kitt Peak || Spacewatch || — || align=right | 2.0 km || 
|-id=669 bgcolor=#d6d6d6
| 467669 ||  || — || October 22, 2008 || Kitt Peak || Spacewatch || EOS || align=right | 2.0 km || 
|-id=670 bgcolor=#d6d6d6
| 467670 ||  || — || October 22, 2008 || Kitt Peak || Spacewatch || EOS || align=right | 1.8 km || 
|-id=671 bgcolor=#E9E9E9
| 467671 ||  || — || October 22, 2008 || Kitt Peak || Spacewatch || DOR || align=right | 2.4 km || 
|-id=672 bgcolor=#d6d6d6
| 467672 ||  || — || October 22, 2008 || Kitt Peak || Spacewatch || — || align=right | 3.1 km || 
|-id=673 bgcolor=#d6d6d6
| 467673 ||  || — || October 23, 2008 || Bergisch Gladbach || W. Bickel || — || align=right | 2.5 km || 
|-id=674 bgcolor=#d6d6d6
| 467674 ||  || — || October 24, 2008 || Kitt Peak || Spacewatch || — || align=right | 3.1 km || 
|-id=675 bgcolor=#d6d6d6
| 467675 ||  || — || October 1, 2008 || Mount Lemmon || Mount Lemmon Survey || — || align=right | 2.6 km || 
|-id=676 bgcolor=#d6d6d6
| 467676 ||  || — || September 23, 2008 || Mount Lemmon || Mount Lemmon Survey || TIR || align=right | 2.7 km || 
|-id=677 bgcolor=#E9E9E9
| 467677 ||  || — || September 23, 2008 || Kitt Peak || Spacewatch || — || align=right | 2.4 km || 
|-id=678 bgcolor=#E9E9E9
| 467678 ||  || — || October 25, 2008 || Kitt Peak || Spacewatch || — || align=right | 2.3 km || 
|-id=679 bgcolor=#d6d6d6
| 467679 ||  || — || October 26, 2008 || Mount Lemmon || Mount Lemmon Survey || — || align=right | 2.3 km || 
|-id=680 bgcolor=#d6d6d6
| 467680 ||  || — || October 26, 2008 || Kitt Peak || Spacewatch || EOS || align=right | 1.8 km || 
|-id=681 bgcolor=#d6d6d6
| 467681 ||  || — || October 26, 2008 || Kitt Peak || Spacewatch || — || align=right | 3.7 km || 
|-id=682 bgcolor=#E9E9E9
| 467682 ||  || — || October 28, 2008 || Kitt Peak || Spacewatch || — || align=right | 2.4 km || 
|-id=683 bgcolor=#d6d6d6
| 467683 ||  || — || October 28, 2008 || Mount Lemmon || Mount Lemmon Survey || — || align=right | 2.9 km || 
|-id=684 bgcolor=#d6d6d6
| 467684 ||  || — || October 28, 2008 || Kitt Peak || Spacewatch || — || align=right | 2.4 km || 
|-id=685 bgcolor=#d6d6d6
| 467685 ||  || — || October 30, 2008 || Kitt Peak || Spacewatch || — || align=right | 3.2 km || 
|-id=686 bgcolor=#d6d6d6
| 467686 ||  || — || October 30, 2008 || Kitt Peak || Spacewatch || EOS || align=right | 1.7 km || 
|-id=687 bgcolor=#d6d6d6
| 467687 ||  || — || October 31, 2008 || Kitt Peak || Spacewatch || — || align=right | 2.2 km || 
|-id=688 bgcolor=#d6d6d6
| 467688 ||  || — || October 23, 2008 || Kitt Peak || Spacewatch || — || align=right | 2.7 km || 
|-id=689 bgcolor=#d6d6d6
| 467689 ||  || — || October 24, 2008 || Kitt Peak || Spacewatch || — || align=right | 2.4 km || 
|-id=690 bgcolor=#d6d6d6
| 467690 ||  || — || October 25, 2008 || Kitt Peak || Spacewatch || — || align=right | 3.1 km || 
|-id=691 bgcolor=#E9E9E9
| 467691 ||  || — || October 6, 2008 || Mount Lemmon || Mount Lemmon Survey || — || align=right | 2.3 km || 
|-id=692 bgcolor=#d6d6d6
| 467692 ||  || — || October 6, 2008 || Mount Lemmon || Mount Lemmon Survey || — || align=right | 2.5 km || 
|-id=693 bgcolor=#E9E9E9
| 467693 ||  || — || November 1, 2008 || Mount Lemmon || Mount Lemmon Survey || — || align=right | 2.6 km || 
|-id=694 bgcolor=#d6d6d6
| 467694 ||  || — || November 1, 2008 || Mount Lemmon || Mount Lemmon Survey || — || align=right | 2.5 km || 
|-id=695 bgcolor=#d6d6d6
| 467695 ||  || — || October 20, 2008 || Kitt Peak || Spacewatch || — || align=right | 2.5 km || 
|-id=696 bgcolor=#d6d6d6
| 467696 ||  || — || November 17, 2008 || Kitt Peak || Spacewatch || — || align=right | 2.2 km || 
|-id=697 bgcolor=#d6d6d6
| 467697 ||  || — || November 6, 2008 || Mount Lemmon || Mount Lemmon Survey || EOS || align=right | 1.5 km || 
|-id=698 bgcolor=#d6d6d6
| 467698 ||  || — || October 28, 2008 || Kitt Peak || Spacewatch || — || align=right | 1.9 km || 
|-id=699 bgcolor=#d6d6d6
| 467699 ||  || — || November 1, 2008 || Kitt Peak || Spacewatch || — || align=right | 2.8 km || 
|-id=700 bgcolor=#d6d6d6
| 467700 ||  || — || November 20, 2003 || Socorro || LINEAR || — || align=right | 3.0 km || 
|}

467701–467800 

|-bgcolor=#d6d6d6
| 467701 ||  || — || November 8, 2008 || Mount Lemmon || Mount Lemmon Survey || — || align=right | 3.2 km || 
|-id=702 bgcolor=#d6d6d6
| 467702 ||  || — || November 17, 2008 || Kitt Peak || Spacewatch || — || align=right | 2.9 km || 
|-id=703 bgcolor=#d6d6d6
| 467703 ||  || — || November 8, 2008 || Kitt Peak || Spacewatch || EOS || align=right | 1.6 km || 
|-id=704 bgcolor=#d6d6d6
| 467704 ||  || — || December 4, 2008 || Mount Lemmon || Mount Lemmon Survey || Tj (2.99) || align=right | 4.3 km || 
|-id=705 bgcolor=#d6d6d6
| 467705 ||  || — || December 22, 2008 || Kitt Peak || Spacewatch || — || align=right | 2.8 km || 
|-id=706 bgcolor=#fefefe
| 467706 ||  || — || December 29, 2008 || Mount Lemmon || Mount Lemmon Survey || — || align=right data-sort-value="0.73" | 730 m || 
|-id=707 bgcolor=#fefefe
| 467707 ||  || — || January 26, 2006 || Mount Lemmon || Mount Lemmon Survey || — || align=right data-sort-value="0.62" | 620 m || 
|-id=708 bgcolor=#d6d6d6
| 467708 ||  || — || May 7, 2006 || Mount Lemmon || Mount Lemmon Survey || EOS || align=right | 1.6 km || 
|-id=709 bgcolor=#d6d6d6
| 467709 ||  || — || November 2, 2008 || Mount Lemmon || Mount Lemmon Survey || — || align=right | 4.1 km || 
|-id=710 bgcolor=#d6d6d6
| 467710 ||  || — || December 5, 2008 || Kitt Peak || Spacewatch || — || align=right | 3.9 km || 
|-id=711 bgcolor=#d6d6d6
| 467711 ||  || — || January 2, 2009 || Mount Lemmon || Mount Lemmon Survey || — || align=right | 2.5 km || 
|-id=712 bgcolor=#d6d6d6
| 467712 ||  || — || December 21, 2008 || Mount Lemmon || Mount Lemmon Survey || EOS || align=right | 1.8 km || 
|-id=713 bgcolor=#fefefe
| 467713 ||  || — || January 16, 2009 || Mount Lemmon || Mount Lemmon Survey || — || align=right data-sort-value="0.80" | 800 m || 
|-id=714 bgcolor=#d6d6d6
| 467714 ||  || — || January 16, 2009 || Kitt Peak || Spacewatch || — || align=right | 4.9 km || 
|-id=715 bgcolor=#d6d6d6
| 467715 ||  || — || December 29, 2008 || Mount Lemmon || Mount Lemmon Survey || — || align=right | 3.0 km || 
|-id=716 bgcolor=#d6d6d6
| 467716 ||  || — || January 25, 2009 || Kitt Peak || Spacewatch || — || align=right | 2.7 km || 
|-id=717 bgcolor=#d6d6d6
| 467717 ||  || — || January 25, 2009 || Catalina || CSS || — || align=right | 4.2 km || 
|-id=718 bgcolor=#fefefe
| 467718 ||  || — || January 31, 2009 || Kitt Peak || Spacewatch || — || align=right data-sort-value="0.54" | 540 m || 
|-id=719 bgcolor=#d6d6d6
| 467719 ||  || — || December 30, 2008 || Mount Lemmon || Mount Lemmon Survey || — || align=right | 2.9 km || 
|-id=720 bgcolor=#fefefe
| 467720 ||  || — || February 17, 2009 || Socorro || LINEAR || — || align=right data-sort-value="0.83" | 830 m || 
|-id=721 bgcolor=#fefefe
| 467721 ||  || — || February 3, 2009 || Kitt Peak || Spacewatch || — || align=right data-sort-value="0.98" | 980 m || 
|-id=722 bgcolor=#fefefe
| 467722 ||  || — || February 13, 2009 || Kitt Peak || Spacewatch || — || align=right data-sort-value="0.80" | 800 m || 
|-id=723 bgcolor=#fefefe
| 467723 ||  || — || February 28, 2009 || Kitt Peak || Spacewatch || — || align=right data-sort-value="0.52" | 520 m || 
|-id=724 bgcolor=#fefefe
| 467724 ||  || — || March 26, 2009 || Kitt Peak || Spacewatch || — || align=right data-sort-value="0.64" | 640 m || 
|-id=725 bgcolor=#fefefe
| 467725 ||  || — || March 29, 2009 || Kitt Peak || Spacewatch || — || align=right data-sort-value="0.75" | 750 m || 
|-id=726 bgcolor=#fefefe
| 467726 ||  || — || April 17, 2009 || Mount Lemmon || Mount Lemmon Survey || — || align=right data-sort-value="0.51" | 510 m || 
|-id=727 bgcolor=#fefefe
| 467727 ||  || — || April 23, 2009 || Kitt Peak || Spacewatch || — || align=right data-sort-value="0.62" | 620 m || 
|-id=728 bgcolor=#fefefe
| 467728 ||  || — || April 22, 2009 || Mount Lemmon || Mount Lemmon Survey || — || align=right data-sort-value="0.83" | 830 m || 
|-id=729 bgcolor=#fefefe
| 467729 ||  || — || April 27, 2009 || Kitt Peak || Spacewatch || — || align=right data-sort-value="0.57" | 570 m || 
|-id=730 bgcolor=#fefefe
| 467730 ||  || — || May 4, 2009 || Siding Spring || SSS || — || align=right data-sort-value="0.88" | 880 m || 
|-id=731 bgcolor=#E9E9E9
| 467731 ||  || — || June 17, 2009 || Kitt Peak || Spacewatch || — || align=right data-sort-value="0.98" | 980 m || 
|-id=732 bgcolor=#fefefe
| 467732 ||  || — || July 27, 2009 || Kitt Peak || Spacewatch || — || align=right data-sort-value="0.82" | 820 m || 
|-id=733 bgcolor=#fefefe
| 467733 ||  || — || August 15, 2009 || Kitt Peak || Spacewatch || — || align=right data-sort-value="0.90" | 900 m || 
|-id=734 bgcolor=#fefefe
| 467734 ||  || — || June 27, 2009 || Mount Lemmon || Mount Lemmon Survey || — || align=right data-sort-value="0.78" | 780 m || 
|-id=735 bgcolor=#E9E9E9
| 467735 ||  || — || August 15, 2009 || Kitt Peak || Spacewatch || — || align=right | 1.5 km || 
|-id=736 bgcolor=#fefefe
| 467736 ||  || — || August 18, 2009 || Kitt Peak || Spacewatch || — || align=right data-sort-value="0.90" | 900 m || 
|-id=737 bgcolor=#fefefe
| 467737 ||  || — || September 12, 2009 || Kitt Peak || Spacewatch || H || align=right data-sort-value="0.50" | 500 m || 
|-id=738 bgcolor=#E9E9E9
| 467738 ||  || — || September 12, 2009 || Kitt Peak || Spacewatch || — || align=right data-sort-value="0.92" | 920 m || 
|-id=739 bgcolor=#E9E9E9
| 467739 ||  || — || September 12, 2009 || Kitt Peak || Spacewatch || (5) || align=right data-sort-value="0.70" | 700 m || 
|-id=740 bgcolor=#E9E9E9
| 467740 ||  || — || September 13, 2005 || Kitt Peak || Spacewatch || — || align=right data-sort-value="0.87" | 870 m || 
|-id=741 bgcolor=#fefefe
| 467741 ||  || — || September 18, 2009 || Catalina || CSS || critical || align=right | 1.7 km || 
|-id=742 bgcolor=#E9E9E9
| 467742 ||  || — || September 16, 2009 || Kitt Peak || Spacewatch || — || align=right data-sort-value="0.92" | 920 m || 
|-id=743 bgcolor=#C2FFFF
| 467743 ||  || — || September 17, 2009 || Kitt Peak || Spacewatch || L4 || align=right | 7.9 km || 
|-id=744 bgcolor=#E9E9E9
| 467744 ||  || — || September 17, 2009 || Mount Lemmon || Mount Lemmon Survey || — || align=right data-sort-value="0.80" | 800 m || 
|-id=745 bgcolor=#E9E9E9
| 467745 ||  || — || September 19, 2009 || Mount Lemmon || Mount Lemmon Survey || — || align=right data-sort-value="0.74" | 740 m || 
|-id=746 bgcolor=#C2FFFF
| 467746 ||  || — || September 19, 2009 || Kitt Peak || Spacewatch || L4 || align=right | 9.6 km || 
|-id=747 bgcolor=#fefefe
| 467747 ||  || — || September 20, 2009 || Kitt Peak || Spacewatch || critical || align=right data-sort-value="0.59" | 590 m || 
|-id=748 bgcolor=#C2FFFF
| 467748 ||  || — || September 17, 2009 || Kitt Peak || Spacewatch || L4 || align=right | 7.9 km || 
|-id=749 bgcolor=#E9E9E9
| 467749 ||  || — || September 21, 2009 || La Sagra || OAM Obs. || MAR || align=right data-sort-value="0.99" | 990 m || 
|-id=750 bgcolor=#C2FFFF
| 467750 ||  || — || September 22, 2009 || Kitt Peak || Spacewatch || L4 || align=right | 7.9 km || 
|-id=751 bgcolor=#E9E9E9
| 467751 ||  || — || September 28, 2009 || Kitt Peak || Spacewatch || EUN || align=right data-sort-value="0.80" | 800 m || 
|-id=752 bgcolor=#C2FFFF
| 467752 ||  || — || September 20, 2009 || Kitt Peak || Spacewatch || L4 || align=right | 7.9 km || 
|-id=753 bgcolor=#E9E9E9
| 467753 ||  || — || September 18, 2009 || Kitt Peak || Spacewatch || — || align=right data-sort-value="0.97" | 970 m || 
|-id=754 bgcolor=#E9E9E9
| 467754 ||  || — || September 20, 2009 || Catalina || CSS || — || align=right | 1.7 km || 
|-id=755 bgcolor=#E9E9E9
| 467755 ||  || — || October 23, 2009 || Tzec Maun || S. Shurpakov || — || align=right | 3.3 km || 
|-id=756 bgcolor=#E9E9E9
| 467756 ||  || — || October 17, 2009 || Mount Lemmon || Mount Lemmon Survey || — || align=right | 1.3 km || 
|-id=757 bgcolor=#E9E9E9
| 467757 ||  || — || October 1, 2009 || Mount Lemmon || Mount Lemmon Survey || — || align=right | 1.5 km || 
|-id=758 bgcolor=#E9E9E9
| 467758 ||  || — || April 11, 2003 || Kitt Peak || Spacewatch || — || align=right | 2.0 km || 
|-id=759 bgcolor=#E9E9E9
| 467759 ||  || — || October 25, 2009 || XuYi || PMO NEO || — || align=right | 2.4 km || 
|-id=760 bgcolor=#FA8072
| 467760 ||  || — || September 22, 2009 || Catalina || CSS || H || align=right data-sort-value="0.81" | 810 m || 
|-id=761 bgcolor=#E9E9E9
| 467761 ||  || — || October 18, 2009 || Mount Lemmon || Mount Lemmon Survey || — || align=right | 1.5 km || 
|-id=762 bgcolor=#E9E9E9
| 467762 ||  || — || October 27, 2009 || Kitt Peak || Spacewatch || — || align=right | 1.2 km || 
|-id=763 bgcolor=#d6d6d6
| 467763 ||  || — || October 23, 2009 || Mount Lemmon || Mount Lemmon Survey || — || align=right | 2.4 km || 
|-id=764 bgcolor=#E9E9E9
| 467764 ||  || — || October 24, 2009 || Kitt Peak || Spacewatch || — || align=right | 1.9 km || 
|-id=765 bgcolor=#E9E9E9
| 467765 ||  || — || November 8, 2009 || Mount Lemmon || Mount Lemmon Survey || MRX || align=right data-sort-value="0.79" | 790 m || 
|-id=766 bgcolor=#E9E9E9
| 467766 ||  || — || September 16, 2009 || Mount Lemmon || Mount Lemmon Survey || RAF || align=right data-sort-value="0.98" | 980 m || 
|-id=767 bgcolor=#fefefe
| 467767 ||  || — || November 6, 2009 || Catalina || CSS || H || align=right data-sort-value="0.68" | 680 m || 
|-id=768 bgcolor=#E9E9E9
| 467768 ||  || — || November 8, 2009 || Kitt Peak || Spacewatch || — || align=right data-sort-value="0.75" | 750 m || 
|-id=769 bgcolor=#FA8072
| 467769 ||  || — || October 16, 2009 || Socorro || LINEAR || H || align=right data-sort-value="0.84" | 840 m || 
|-id=770 bgcolor=#E9E9E9
| 467770 ||  || — || October 23, 2009 || Mount Lemmon || Mount Lemmon Survey || — || align=right | 1.8 km || 
|-id=771 bgcolor=#E9E9E9
| 467771 ||  || — || September 21, 2009 || Mount Lemmon || Mount Lemmon Survey || (5) || align=right data-sort-value="0.81" | 810 m || 
|-id=772 bgcolor=#E9E9E9
| 467772 ||  || — || November 10, 2009 || Catalina || CSS || — || align=right | 3.7 km || 
|-id=773 bgcolor=#E9E9E9
| 467773 ||  || — || March 15, 2007 || Mount Lemmon || Mount Lemmon Survey || — || align=right | 2.0 km || 
|-id=774 bgcolor=#d6d6d6
| 467774 ||  || — || November 11, 2009 || Mount Lemmon || Mount Lemmon Survey || — || align=right | 4.2 km || 
|-id=775 bgcolor=#E9E9E9
| 467775 ||  || — || October 26, 2009 || Kitt Peak || Spacewatch || — || align=right | 1.6 km || 
|-id=776 bgcolor=#E9E9E9
| 467776 ||  || — || November 10, 2009 || Kitt Peak || Spacewatch || — || align=right | 1.9 km || 
|-id=777 bgcolor=#C2FFFF
| 467777 ||  || — || October 14, 2009 || Mount Lemmon || Mount Lemmon Survey || L4 || align=right | 7.8 km || 
|-id=778 bgcolor=#E9E9E9
| 467778 ||  || — || October 30, 2005 || Mount Lemmon || Mount Lemmon Survey || — || align=right | 2.2 km || 
|-id=779 bgcolor=#C2FFFF
| 467779 ||  || — || November 19, 2009 || Mount Lemmon || Mount Lemmon Survey || L4 || align=right | 13 km || 
|-id=780 bgcolor=#E9E9E9
| 467780 ||  || — || October 23, 2009 || Mount Lemmon || Mount Lemmon Survey || — || align=right | 2.4 km || 
|-id=781 bgcolor=#E9E9E9
| 467781 ||  || — || September 21, 2009 || Mount Lemmon || Mount Lemmon Survey || — || align=right | 1.3 km || 
|-id=782 bgcolor=#E9E9E9
| 467782 ||  || — || November 9, 2009 || Mount Lemmon || Mount Lemmon Survey || — || align=right data-sort-value="0.97" | 970 m || 
|-id=783 bgcolor=#C2FFFF
| 467783 ||  || — || November 19, 2009 || Mount Lemmon || Mount Lemmon Survey || L4 || align=right | 9.3 km || 
|-id=784 bgcolor=#E9E9E9
| 467784 ||  || — || October 26, 2009 || Mount Lemmon || Mount Lemmon Survey || (5) || align=right data-sort-value="0.92" | 920 m || 
|-id=785 bgcolor=#E9E9E9
| 467785 ||  || — || November 9, 2009 || Kitt Peak || Spacewatch || — || align=right | 1.2 km || 
|-id=786 bgcolor=#E9E9E9
| 467786 ||  || — || January 23, 2006 || Kitt Peak || Spacewatch || — || align=right | 1.8 km || 
|-id=787 bgcolor=#d6d6d6
| 467787 ||  || — || October 26, 2009 || Mount Lemmon || Mount Lemmon Survey || NAE || align=right | 2.0 km || 
|-id=788 bgcolor=#E9E9E9
| 467788 ||  || — || November 19, 2009 || Kitt Peak || Spacewatch || — || align=right | 2.2 km || 
|-id=789 bgcolor=#E9E9E9
| 467789 ||  || — || November 8, 2009 || Kitt Peak || Spacewatch || — || align=right | 1.9 km || 
|-id=790 bgcolor=#fefefe
| 467790 ||  || — || November 20, 2009 || Socorro || LINEAR || H || align=right data-sort-value="0.82" | 820 m || 
|-id=791 bgcolor=#E9E9E9
| 467791 ||  || — || November 16, 2009 || Kitt Peak || Spacewatch || — || align=right | 2.1 km || 
|-id=792 bgcolor=#d6d6d6
| 467792 ||  || — || November 23, 2009 || Mount Lemmon || Mount Lemmon Survey || EOS || align=right | 2.1 km || 
|-id=793 bgcolor=#E9E9E9
| 467793 ||  || — || November 26, 2009 || Mount Lemmon || Mount Lemmon Survey || — || align=right | 2.3 km || 
|-id=794 bgcolor=#fefefe
| 467794 ||  || — || December 10, 2009 || Mayhill || A. Lowe || ERI || align=right | 1.6 km || 
|-id=795 bgcolor=#E9E9E9
| 467795 ||  || — || November 17, 2009 || Kitt Peak || Spacewatch || — || align=right | 2.0 km || 
|-id=796 bgcolor=#E9E9E9
| 467796 ||  || — || November 20, 2009 || Kitt Peak || Spacewatch || — || align=right | 1.1 km || 
|-id=797 bgcolor=#d6d6d6
| 467797 ||  || — || November 19, 2003 || Kitt Peak || Spacewatch || — || align=right | 3.0 km || 
|-id=798 bgcolor=#E9E9E9
| 467798 ||  || — || January 4, 2010 || Kitt Peak || Spacewatch || — || align=right data-sort-value="0.88" | 880 m || 
|-id=799 bgcolor=#fefefe
| 467799 ||  || — || January 6, 2010 || Catalina || CSS || H || align=right data-sort-value="0.78" | 780 m || 
|-id=800 bgcolor=#fefefe
| 467800 ||  || — || December 20, 2009 || Kitt Peak || Spacewatch || H || align=right | 1.1 km || 
|}

467801–467900 

|-bgcolor=#C2FFFF
| 467801 ||  || — || September 30, 2009 || Mount Lemmon || Mount Lemmon Survey || L4 || align=right | 11 km || 
|-id=802 bgcolor=#d6d6d6
| 467802 ||  || — || October 12, 2007 || Mount Lemmon || Mount Lemmon Survey || — || align=right | 3.8 km || 
|-id=803 bgcolor=#d6d6d6
| 467803 ||  || — || January 20, 2010 || WISE || WISE || — || align=right | 3.6 km || 
|-id=804 bgcolor=#d6d6d6
| 467804 ||  || — || January 24, 2010 || WISE || WISE || — || align=right | 4.4 km || 
|-id=805 bgcolor=#d6d6d6
| 467805 ||  || — || January 31, 2010 || WISE || WISE || — || align=right | 5.0 km || 
|-id=806 bgcolor=#E9E9E9
| 467806 ||  || — || November 8, 2009 || Mount Lemmon || Mount Lemmon Survey || — || align=right | 2.1 km || 
|-id=807 bgcolor=#d6d6d6
| 467807 ||  || — || February 9, 2010 || Kitt Peak || Spacewatch || — || align=right | 3.7 km || 
|-id=808 bgcolor=#d6d6d6
| 467808 ||  || — || February 14, 2010 || Kitt Peak || Spacewatch || — || align=right | 2.5 km || 
|-id=809 bgcolor=#d6d6d6
| 467809 ||  || — || February 14, 2010 || Kitt Peak || Spacewatch || — || align=right | 2.1 km || 
|-id=810 bgcolor=#d6d6d6
| 467810 ||  || — || November 18, 2003 || Kitt Peak || Spacewatch || — || align=right | 2.5 km || 
|-id=811 bgcolor=#d6d6d6
| 467811 ||  || — || February 14, 2010 || Mount Lemmon || Mount Lemmon Survey || — || align=right | 3.5 km || 
|-id=812 bgcolor=#d6d6d6
| 467812 ||  || — || January 11, 2010 || Kitt Peak || Spacewatch || EOS || align=right | 1.8 km || 
|-id=813 bgcolor=#d6d6d6
| 467813 ||  || — || May 4, 2005 || Mount Lemmon || Mount Lemmon Survey || THM || align=right | 1.8 km || 
|-id=814 bgcolor=#d6d6d6
| 467814 ||  || — || March 12, 2010 || Mount Lemmon || Mount Lemmon Survey || — || align=right | 2.5 km || 
|-id=815 bgcolor=#d6d6d6
| 467815 ||  || — || March 12, 2010 || Kitt Peak || Spacewatch || — || align=right | 2.1 km || 
|-id=816 bgcolor=#d6d6d6
| 467816 ||  || — || August 24, 2007 || Kitt Peak || Spacewatch || — || align=right | 2.9 km || 
|-id=817 bgcolor=#d6d6d6
| 467817 ||  || — || March 16, 2010 || Kitt Peak || Spacewatch || — || align=right | 2.8 km || 
|-id=818 bgcolor=#d6d6d6
| 467818 ||  || — || November 21, 2009 || Mount Lemmon || Mount Lemmon Survey || — || align=right | 2.5 km || 
|-id=819 bgcolor=#d6d6d6
| 467819 ||  || — || May 6, 2010 || Mount Lemmon || Mount Lemmon Survey || LIX || align=right | 3.3 km || 
|-id=820 bgcolor=#d6d6d6
| 467820 ||  || — || May 7, 2010 || Kitt Peak || Spacewatch || 7:4 || align=right | 3.0 km || 
|-id=821 bgcolor=#d6d6d6
| 467821 ||  || — || May 11, 2010 || WISE || WISE || — || align=right | 4.7 km || 
|-id=822 bgcolor=#d6d6d6
| 467822 ||  || — || April 10, 2005 || Mount Lemmon || Mount Lemmon Survey || — || align=right | 3.7 km || 
|-id=823 bgcolor=#d6d6d6
| 467823 ||  || — || May 22, 2010 || Mount Lemmon || Mount Lemmon Survey || criticalTj (2.97) || align=right | 2.8 km || 
|-id=824 bgcolor=#fefefe
| 467824 ||  || — || June 13, 2010 || WISE || WISE || — || align=right | 1.9 km || 
|-id=825 bgcolor=#fefefe
| 467825 ||  || — || July 10, 2010 || La Sagra || OAM Obs. || — || align=right data-sort-value="0.83" | 830 m || 
|-id=826 bgcolor=#fefefe
| 467826 ||  || — || April 24, 2009 || Mount Lemmon || Mount Lemmon Survey || — || align=right | 1.2 km || 
|-id=827 bgcolor=#d6d6d6
| 467827 ||  || — || July 28, 2010 || WISE || WISE || Tj (2.97) || align=right | 2.6 km || 
|-id=828 bgcolor=#d6d6d6
| 467828 ||  || — || July 29, 2010 || WISE || WISE || 7:4 || align=right | 3.8 km || 
|-id=829 bgcolor=#fefefe
| 467829 ||  || — || August 10, 2010 || Kitt Peak || Spacewatch || — || align=right data-sort-value="0.69" | 690 m || 
|-id=830 bgcolor=#fefefe
| 467830 ||  || — || September 1, 2010 || Socorro || LINEAR || — || align=right data-sort-value="0.75" | 750 m || 
|-id=831 bgcolor=#fefefe
| 467831 ||  || — || September 2, 2010 || Socorro || LINEAR || V || align=right data-sort-value="0.86" | 860 m || 
|-id=832 bgcolor=#fefefe
| 467832 ||  || — || September 4, 2010 || Kitt Peak || Spacewatch || — || align=right data-sort-value="0.74" | 740 m || 
|-id=833 bgcolor=#FA8072
| 467833 ||  || — || September 2, 2010 || Mount Lemmon || Mount Lemmon Survey || — || align=right data-sort-value="0.60" | 600 m || 
|-id=834 bgcolor=#fefefe
| 467834 ||  || — || May 2, 2006 || Mount Lemmon || Mount Lemmon Survey || — || align=right data-sort-value="0.65" | 650 m || 
|-id=835 bgcolor=#FFC2E0
| 467835 ||  || — || September 16, 2010 || Mount Lemmon || Mount Lemmon Survey || AMO || align=right data-sort-value="0.22" | 220 m || 
|-id=836 bgcolor=#fefefe
| 467836 ||  || — || October 30, 2000 || Socorro || LINEAR || — || align=right data-sort-value="0.84" | 840 m || 
|-id=837 bgcolor=#fefefe
| 467837 ||  || — || October 3, 2010 || Kitt Peak || Spacewatch || — || align=right data-sort-value="0.92" | 920 m || 
|-id=838 bgcolor=#fefefe
| 467838 ||  || — || October 1, 2010 || Kitt Peak || Spacewatch || V || align=right data-sort-value="0.53" | 530 m || 
|-id=839 bgcolor=#fefefe
| 467839 ||  || — || September 17, 2003 || Kitt Peak || Spacewatch || — || align=right data-sort-value="0.68" | 680 m || 
|-id=840 bgcolor=#fefefe
| 467840 ||  || — || December 3, 2007 || Kitt Peak || Spacewatch || — || align=right data-sort-value="0.68" | 680 m || 
|-id=841 bgcolor=#fefefe
| 467841 ||  || — || September 29, 2010 || Kitt Peak || Spacewatch || — || align=right data-sort-value="0.75" | 750 m || 
|-id=842 bgcolor=#fefefe
| 467842 ||  || — || October 21, 2003 || Kitt Peak || Spacewatch || — || align=right data-sort-value="0.82" | 820 m || 
|-id=843 bgcolor=#fefefe
| 467843 ||  || — || July 20, 2010 || WISE || WISE || — || align=right data-sort-value="0.77" | 770 m || 
|-id=844 bgcolor=#fefefe
| 467844 ||  || — || September 30, 2010 || Mount Lemmon || Mount Lemmon Survey || — || align=right data-sort-value="0.92" | 920 m || 
|-id=845 bgcolor=#FA8072
| 467845 ||  || — || October 16, 2003 || Anderson Mesa || LONEOS || — || align=right | 1.2 km || 
|-id=846 bgcolor=#E9E9E9
| 467846 ||  || — || September 30, 2010 || Mount Lemmon || Mount Lemmon Survey || — || align=right | 1.8 km || 
|-id=847 bgcolor=#fefefe
| 467847 ||  || — || October 11, 2010 || Mount Lemmon || Mount Lemmon Survey || — || align=right data-sort-value="0.64" | 640 m || 
|-id=848 bgcolor=#fefefe
| 467848 ||  || — || November 6, 2010 || Mount Lemmon || Mount Lemmon Survey || V || align=right data-sort-value="0.50" | 500 m || 
|-id=849 bgcolor=#fefefe
| 467849 ||  || — || October 19, 2010 || Mount Lemmon || Mount Lemmon Survey || — || align=right data-sort-value="0.57" | 570 m || 
|-id=850 bgcolor=#fefefe
| 467850 ||  || — || October 28, 2010 || Mount Lemmon || Mount Lemmon Survey || — || align=right data-sort-value="0.83" | 830 m || 
|-id=851 bgcolor=#fefefe
| 467851 ||  || — || February 13, 2008 || Mount Lemmon || Mount Lemmon Survey || — || align=right data-sort-value="0.75" | 750 m || 
|-id=852 bgcolor=#C2FFFF
| 467852 ||  || — || November 6, 2010 || Mount Lemmon || Mount Lemmon Survey || L4 || align=right | 9.4 km || 
|-id=853 bgcolor=#fefefe
| 467853 ||  || — || November 5, 2010 || Mount Lemmon || Mount Lemmon Survey || — || align=right data-sort-value="0.90" | 900 m || 
|-id=854 bgcolor=#C2FFFF
| 467854 ||  || — || October 19, 2010 || Mount Lemmon || Mount Lemmon Survey || L4 || align=right | 7.1 km || 
|-id=855 bgcolor=#C2FFFF
| 467855 ||  || — || November 27, 1998 || Kitt Peak || Spacewatch || L4 || align=right | 7.9 km || 
|-id=856 bgcolor=#C2FFFF
| 467856 ||  || — || November 5, 2010 || Kitt Peak || Spacewatch || L4 || align=right | 8.3 km || 
|-id=857 bgcolor=#E9E9E9
| 467857 ||  || — || December 13, 2006 || Mount Lemmon || Mount Lemmon Survey || — || align=right data-sort-value="0.99" | 990 m || 
|-id=858 bgcolor=#C2FFFF
| 467858 ||  || — || November 10, 2010 || Mount Lemmon || Mount Lemmon Survey || L4 || align=right | 8.5 km || 
|-id=859 bgcolor=#C2FFFF
| 467859 ||  || — || January 20, 2010 || WISE || WISE || L4 || align=right | 15 km || 
|-id=860 bgcolor=#E9E9E9
| 467860 ||  || — || December 21, 2006 || Kitt Peak || Spacewatch || — || align=right | 1.2 km || 
|-id=861 bgcolor=#E9E9E9
| 467861 ||  || — || October 14, 2010 || Mount Lemmon || Mount Lemmon Survey || (5) || align=right data-sort-value="0.77" | 770 m || 
|-id=862 bgcolor=#E9E9E9
| 467862 ||  || — || October 1, 2005 || Kitt Peak || Spacewatch || — || align=right | 1.3 km || 
|-id=863 bgcolor=#E9E9E9
| 467863 ||  || — || August 30, 2005 || Campo Imperatore || CINEOS || (5) || align=right data-sort-value="0.79" | 790 m || 
|-id=864 bgcolor=#E9E9E9
| 467864 ||  || — || January 10, 2011 || Mount Lemmon || Mount Lemmon Survey || (5) || align=right data-sort-value="0.65" | 650 m || 
|-id=865 bgcolor=#E9E9E9
| 467865 ||  || — || March 15, 2007 || Kitt Peak || Spacewatch || — || align=right | 1.4 km || 
|-id=866 bgcolor=#E9E9E9
| 467866 ||  || — || January 24, 2011 || Mount Lemmon || Mount Lemmon Survey || — || align=right | 1.6 km || 
|-id=867 bgcolor=#E9E9E9
| 467867 ||  || — || June 30, 2008 || Kitt Peak || Spacewatch || — || align=right | 1.1 km || 
|-id=868 bgcolor=#E9E9E9
| 467868 ||  || — || December 8, 2010 || Mount Lemmon || Mount Lemmon Survey || (5) || align=right data-sort-value="0.87" | 870 m || 
|-id=869 bgcolor=#E9E9E9
| 467869 ||  || — || February 23, 2007 || Kitt Peak || Spacewatch || — || align=right | 1.4 km || 
|-id=870 bgcolor=#E9E9E9
| 467870 ||  || — || January 28, 2011 || Mount Lemmon || Mount Lemmon Survey || — || align=right | 1.6 km || 
|-id=871 bgcolor=#E9E9E9
| 467871 ||  || — || January 29, 2011 || Mount Lemmon || Mount Lemmon Survey || — || align=right | 1.3 km || 
|-id=872 bgcolor=#E9E9E9
| 467872 ||  || — || January 11, 2011 || Mount Lemmon || Mount Lemmon Survey || — || align=right | 1.8 km || 
|-id=873 bgcolor=#E9E9E9
| 467873 ||  || — || October 25, 2005 || Kitt Peak || Spacewatch || — || align=right data-sort-value="0.99" | 990 m || 
|-id=874 bgcolor=#E9E9E9
| 467874 ||  || — || March 25, 2003 || Kitt Peak || Spacewatch || — || align=right | 1.2 km || 
|-id=875 bgcolor=#E9E9E9
| 467875 ||  || — || January 16, 2011 || Mount Lemmon || Mount Lemmon Survey || — || align=right data-sort-value="0.98" | 980 m || 
|-id=876 bgcolor=#E9E9E9
| 467876 ||  || — || August 25, 2004 || Kitt Peak || Spacewatch || — || align=right | 2.7 km || 
|-id=877 bgcolor=#E9E9E9
| 467877 ||  || — || March 13, 2007 || Kitt Peak || Spacewatch || — || align=right | 1.4 km || 
|-id=878 bgcolor=#fefefe
| 467878 ||  || — || March 25, 2006 || Catalina || CSS || H || align=right data-sort-value="0.81" | 810 m || 
|-id=879 bgcolor=#d6d6d6
| 467879 ||  || — || January 8, 2011 || Mount Lemmon || Mount Lemmon Survey || — || align=right | 2.5 km || 
|-id=880 bgcolor=#E9E9E9
| 467880 ||  || — || February 11, 2011 || Mount Lemmon || Mount Lemmon Survey || DOR || align=right | 2.0 km || 
|-id=881 bgcolor=#E9E9E9
| 467881 ||  || — || February 8, 2011 || Mount Lemmon || Mount Lemmon Survey || — || align=right | 1.4 km || 
|-id=882 bgcolor=#E9E9E9
| 467882 ||  || — || October 8, 2004 || Kitt Peak || Spacewatch || — || align=right | 1.6 km || 
|-id=883 bgcolor=#E9E9E9
| 467883 ||  || — || January 25, 2006 || Kitt Peak || Spacewatch || — || align=right | 1.9 km || 
|-id=884 bgcolor=#E9E9E9
| 467884 ||  || — || September 4, 2008 || Kitt Peak || Spacewatch || — || align=right | 1.8 km || 
|-id=885 bgcolor=#d6d6d6
| 467885 ||  || — || March 6, 2011 || Kitt Peak || Spacewatch || — || align=right | 2.9 km || 
|-id=886 bgcolor=#E9E9E9
| 467886 ||  || — || February 23, 2011 || Kitt Peak || Spacewatch || — || align=right | 2.4 km || 
|-id=887 bgcolor=#d6d6d6
| 467887 ||  || — || April 7, 2006 || Kitt Peak || Spacewatch || EOS || align=right | 1.8 km || 
|-id=888 bgcolor=#d6d6d6
| 467888 ||  || — || March 29, 2011 || XuYi || PMO NEO || — || align=right | 2.8 km || 
|-id=889 bgcolor=#E9E9E9
| 467889 ||  || — || March 29, 2011 || Kitt Peak || Spacewatch || — || align=right | 1.9 km || 
|-id=890 bgcolor=#d6d6d6
| 467890 ||  || — || October 11, 2007 || Mount Lemmon || Mount Lemmon Survey || — || align=right | 3.2 km || 
|-id=891 bgcolor=#E9E9E9
| 467891 ||  || — || April 4, 2011 || Kitt Peak || Spacewatch || — || align=right | 2.3 km || 
|-id=892 bgcolor=#d6d6d6
| 467892 ||  || — || March 24, 2006 || Mount Lemmon || Mount Lemmon Survey || — || align=right | 2.1 km || 
|-id=893 bgcolor=#d6d6d6
| 467893 ||  || — || November 18, 2008 || Kitt Peak || Spacewatch || — || align=right | 3.0 km || 
|-id=894 bgcolor=#d6d6d6
| 467894 ||  || — || April 22, 2011 || Kitt Peak || Spacewatch || — || align=right | 2.7 km || 
|-id=895 bgcolor=#d6d6d6
| 467895 ||  || — || October 26, 2008 || Kitt Peak || Spacewatch || — || align=right | 2.6 km || 
|-id=896 bgcolor=#d6d6d6
| 467896 ||  || — || January 6, 2010 || Kitt Peak || Spacewatch || — || align=right | 2.8 km || 
|-id=897 bgcolor=#d6d6d6
| 467897 ||  || — || April 11, 2011 || Mount Lemmon || Mount Lemmon Survey || — || align=right | 2.3 km || 
|-id=898 bgcolor=#d6d6d6
| 467898 ||  || — || April 3, 2010 || WISE || WISE || — || align=right | 2.5 km || 
|-id=899 bgcolor=#d6d6d6
| 467899 ||  || — || May 18, 2010 || WISE || WISE || — || align=right | 5.3 km || 
|-id=900 bgcolor=#FA8072
| 467900 ||  || — || April 30, 2011 || Mount Lemmon || Mount Lemmon Survey || H || align=right data-sort-value="0.68" | 680 m || 
|}

467901–468000 

|-bgcolor=#FA8072
| 467901 ||  || — || April 24, 2011 || Kitt Peak || Spacewatch || H || align=right data-sort-value="0.80" | 800 m || 
|-id=902 bgcolor=#E9E9E9
| 467902 ||  || — || September 30, 2003 || Kitt Peak || Spacewatch || — || align=right | 2.3 km || 
|-id=903 bgcolor=#d6d6d6
| 467903 ||  || — || April 19, 2006 || Mount Lemmon || Mount Lemmon Survey || — || align=right | 2.0 km || 
|-id=904 bgcolor=#d6d6d6
| 467904 ||  || — || April 24, 2011 || Kitt Peak || Spacewatch || — || align=right | 3.8 km || 
|-id=905 bgcolor=#E9E9E9
| 467905 ||  || — || April 13, 2011 || Mount Lemmon || Mount Lemmon Survey || — || align=right | 2.7 km || 
|-id=906 bgcolor=#d6d6d6
| 467906 ||  || — || February 14, 2010 || Mount Lemmon || Mount Lemmon Survey || EOS || align=right | 1.7 km || 
|-id=907 bgcolor=#d6d6d6
| 467907 ||  || — || May 17, 2010 || WISE || WISE || — || align=right | 3.8 km || 
|-id=908 bgcolor=#d6d6d6
| 467908 ||  || — || May 26, 2010 || WISE || WISE || — || align=right | 3.6 km || 
|-id=909 bgcolor=#d6d6d6
| 467909 ||  || — || May 3, 2010 || WISE || WISE || — || align=right | 2.6 km || 
|-id=910 bgcolor=#d6d6d6
| 467910 ||  || — || October 13, 2007 || Kitt Peak || Spacewatch || — || align=right | 2.7 km || 
|-id=911 bgcolor=#d6d6d6
| 467911 ||  || — || September 13, 2007 || Mount Lemmon || Mount Lemmon Survey || — || align=right | 2.0 km || 
|-id=912 bgcolor=#d6d6d6
| 467912 ||  || — || May 17, 2010 || WISE || WISE || — || align=right | 3.4 km || 
|-id=913 bgcolor=#d6d6d6
| 467913 ||  || — || May 27, 2011 || Catalina || CSS || — || align=right | 3.1 km || 
|-id=914 bgcolor=#fefefe
| 467914 ||  || — || November 20, 2009 || Mount Lemmon || Mount Lemmon Survey || H || align=right data-sort-value="0.78" | 780 m || 
|-id=915 bgcolor=#d6d6d6
| 467915 ||  || — || February 12, 2004 || Kitt Peak || Spacewatch || — || align=right | 2.9 km || 
|-id=916 bgcolor=#fefefe
| 467916 ||  || — || December 12, 2006 || Kitt Peak || Spacewatch || — || align=right data-sort-value="0.80" | 800 m || 
|-id=917 bgcolor=#FFC2E0
| 467917 ||  || — || July 28, 2011 || Haleakala || Pan-STARRS || APO || align=right data-sort-value="0.37" | 370 m || 
|-id=918 bgcolor=#d6d6d6
| 467918 ||  || — || February 16, 2010 || Siding Spring || SSS || — || align=right | 4.8 km || 
|-id=919 bgcolor=#d6d6d6
| 467919 ||  || — || March 18, 2010 || Kitt Peak || Spacewatch || LIX || align=right | 2.6 km || 
|-id=920 bgcolor=#fefefe
| 467920 ||  || — || September 24, 2011 || Catalina || CSS || H || align=right data-sort-value="0.44" | 440 m || 
|-id=921 bgcolor=#fefefe
| 467921 ||  || — || September 24, 2011 || Catalina || CSS || H || align=right data-sort-value="0.76" | 760 m || 
|-id=922 bgcolor=#d6d6d6
| 467922 ||  || — || October 17, 2011 || Kitt Peak || Spacewatch || 3:2 || align=right | 4.9 km || 
|-id=923 bgcolor=#FA8072
| 467923 ||  || — || June 16, 2007 || Kitt Peak || Spacewatch || — || align=right data-sort-value="0.97" | 970 m || 
|-id=924 bgcolor=#fefefe
| 467924 ||  || — || December 29, 2011 || Kitt Peak || Spacewatch || — || align=right | 1.0 km || 
|-id=925 bgcolor=#fefefe
| 467925 ||  || — || December 29, 2011 || Kitt Peak || Spacewatch || — || align=right data-sort-value="0.75" | 750 m || 
|-id=926 bgcolor=#C2FFFF
| 467926 ||  || — || December 3, 2010 || Mount Lemmon || Mount Lemmon Survey || L4 || align=right | 9.9 km || 
|-id=927 bgcolor=#C2FFFF
| 467927 ||  || — || September 24, 2008 || Mount Lemmon || Mount Lemmon Survey || L4 || align=right | 7.3 km || 
|-id=928 bgcolor=#fefefe
| 467928 ||  || — || December 15, 2004 || Catalina || CSS || — || align=right data-sort-value="0.96" | 960 m || 
|-id=929 bgcolor=#E9E9E9
| 467929 ||  || — || January 18, 2012 || Mount Lemmon || Mount Lemmon Survey || — || align=right | 2.2 km || 
|-id=930 bgcolor=#fefefe
| 467930 ||  || — || January 21, 2012 || Kitt Peak || Spacewatch || — || align=right data-sort-value="0.75" | 750 m || 
|-id=931 bgcolor=#fefefe
| 467931 ||  || — || January 4, 2012 || Mount Lemmon || Mount Lemmon Survey || — || align=right data-sort-value="0.79" | 790 m || 
|-id=932 bgcolor=#fefefe
| 467932 ||  || — || January 21, 2012 || Kitt Peak || Spacewatch || — || align=right data-sort-value="0.79" | 790 m || 
|-id=933 bgcolor=#fefefe
| 467933 ||  || — || January 26, 2012 || Kitt Peak || Spacewatch || — || align=right data-sort-value="0.65" | 650 m || 
|-id=934 bgcolor=#fefefe
| 467934 ||  || — || November 5, 2007 || Kitt Peak || Spacewatch || critical || align=right data-sort-value="0.62" | 620 m || 
|-id=935 bgcolor=#fefefe
| 467935 ||  || — || January 29, 2012 || Kitt Peak || Spacewatch || — || align=right data-sort-value="0.89" | 890 m || 
|-id=936 bgcolor=#fefefe
| 467936 ||  || — || February 2, 2005 || Kitt Peak || Spacewatch || — || align=right data-sort-value="0.62" | 620 m || 
|-id=937 bgcolor=#fefefe
| 467937 ||  || — || December 5, 2007 || Kitt Peak || Spacewatch || — || align=right data-sort-value="0.76" | 760 m || 
|-id=938 bgcolor=#fefefe
| 467938 ||  || — || March 17, 2005 || Kitt Peak || Spacewatch || — || align=right data-sort-value="0.69" | 690 m || 
|-id=939 bgcolor=#fefefe
| 467939 ||  || — || March 10, 2005 || Mount Lemmon || Mount Lemmon Survey || — || align=right data-sort-value="0.59" | 590 m || 
|-id=940 bgcolor=#fefefe
| 467940 ||  || — || March 8, 2005 || Kitt Peak || Spacewatch || — || align=right data-sort-value="0.63" | 630 m || 
|-id=941 bgcolor=#fefefe
| 467941 ||  || — || March 11, 2005 || Kitt Peak || Spacewatch || — || align=right data-sort-value="0.64" | 640 m || 
|-id=942 bgcolor=#fefefe
| 467942 ||  || — || February 21, 2012 || Kitt Peak || Spacewatch || MAS || align=right data-sort-value="0.60" | 600 m || 
|-id=943 bgcolor=#fefefe
| 467943 ||  || — || February 23, 2012 || Mount Lemmon || Mount Lemmon Survey || NYS || align=right data-sort-value="0.58" | 580 m || 
|-id=944 bgcolor=#fefefe
| 467944 ||  || — || December 18, 2007 || Mount Lemmon || Mount Lemmon Survey || — || align=right data-sort-value="0.70" | 700 m || 
|-id=945 bgcolor=#fefefe
| 467945 ||  || — || February 19, 2012 || Kitt Peak || Spacewatch || MAS || align=right data-sort-value="0.59" | 590 m || 
|-id=946 bgcolor=#fefefe
| 467946 ||  || — || January 27, 2012 || Mount Lemmon || Mount Lemmon Survey || — || align=right data-sort-value="0.54" | 540 m || 
|-id=947 bgcolor=#fefefe
| 467947 ||  || — || February 11, 2012 || Mount Lemmon || Mount Lemmon Survey || — || align=right data-sort-value="0.52" | 520 m || 
|-id=948 bgcolor=#fefefe
| 467948 ||  || — || September 9, 2010 || Kitt Peak || Spacewatch || — || align=right data-sort-value="0.90" | 900 m || 
|-id=949 bgcolor=#fefefe
| 467949 ||  || — || February 1, 2012 || Kitt Peak || Spacewatch || NYS || align=right data-sort-value="0.51" | 510 m || 
|-id=950 bgcolor=#fefefe
| 467950 ||  || — || September 5, 1999 || Kitt Peak || Spacewatch || — || align=right data-sort-value="0.74" | 740 m || 
|-id=951 bgcolor=#fefefe
| 467951 ||  || — || February 8, 2008 || Mount Lemmon || Mount Lemmon Survey || NYS || align=right data-sort-value="0.65" | 650 m || 
|-id=952 bgcolor=#fefefe
| 467952 ||  || — || October 13, 2010 || Mount Lemmon || Mount Lemmon Survey || — || align=right data-sort-value="0.77" | 770 m || 
|-id=953 bgcolor=#fefefe
| 467953 ||  || — || March 13, 2012 || Kitt Peak || Spacewatch || — || align=right data-sort-value="0.90" | 900 m || 
|-id=954 bgcolor=#fefefe
| 467954 ||  || — || December 31, 2007 || Kitt Peak || Spacewatch || NYS || align=right data-sort-value="0.48" | 480 m || 
|-id=955 bgcolor=#fefefe
| 467955 ||  || — || January 4, 2011 || Mount Lemmon || Mount Lemmon Survey || — || align=right data-sort-value="0.89" | 890 m || 
|-id=956 bgcolor=#E9E9E9
| 467956 ||  || — || November 1, 2005 || Mount Lemmon || Mount Lemmon Survey || — || align=right | 1.4 km || 
|-id=957 bgcolor=#E9E9E9
| 467957 ||  || — || January 25, 2011 || Mount Lemmon || Mount Lemmon Survey || — || align=right | 1.6 km || 
|-id=958 bgcolor=#E9E9E9
| 467958 ||  || — || April 18, 2012 || Kitt Peak || Spacewatch || — || align=right | 1.4 km || 
|-id=959 bgcolor=#E9E9E9
| 467959 ||  || — || March 28, 2012 || Mount Lemmon || Mount Lemmon Survey || EUN || align=right | 1.2 km || 
|-id=960 bgcolor=#E9E9E9
| 467960 ||  || — || October 27, 2005 || Kitt Peak || Spacewatch || — || align=right | 1.6 km || 
|-id=961 bgcolor=#E9E9E9
| 467961 ||  || — || March 31, 2012 || Mount Lemmon || Mount Lemmon Survey || — || align=right | 1.9 km || 
|-id=962 bgcolor=#E9E9E9
| 467962 ||  || — || December 25, 2010 || Mount Lemmon || Mount Lemmon Survey || — || align=right data-sort-value="0.84" | 840 m || 
|-id=963 bgcolor=#FFC2E0
| 467963 ||  || — || May 15, 2012 || Mount Lemmon || Mount Lemmon Survey || APO || align=right data-sort-value="0.64" | 640 m || 
|-id=964 bgcolor=#E9E9E9
| 467964 ||  || — || March 27, 2012 || Kitt Peak || Spacewatch || — || align=right | 1.5 km || 
|-id=965 bgcolor=#E9E9E9
| 467965 ||  || — || January 14, 2011 || Mount Lemmon || Mount Lemmon Survey || — || align=right data-sort-value="0.67" | 670 m || 
|-id=966 bgcolor=#E9E9E9
| 467966 ||  || — || April 28, 2012 || Mount Lemmon || Mount Lemmon Survey || — || align=right | 1.0 km || 
|-id=967 bgcolor=#E9E9E9
| 467967 ||  || — || October 23, 2009 || Mount Lemmon || Mount Lemmon Survey || — || align=right | 1.1 km || 
|-id=968 bgcolor=#E9E9E9
| 467968 ||  || — || November 18, 2009 || Mount Lemmon || Mount Lemmon Survey || — || align=right data-sort-value="0.82" | 820 m || 
|-id=969 bgcolor=#E9E9E9
| 467969 ||  || — || January 11, 2011 || Kitt Peak || Spacewatch || — || align=right | 2.0 km || 
|-id=970 bgcolor=#E9E9E9
| 467970 ||  || — || October 26, 2009 || Kitt Peak || Spacewatch || — || align=right | 1.4 km || 
|-id=971 bgcolor=#E9E9E9
| 467971 ||  || — || May 29, 2012 || Mount Lemmon || Mount Lemmon Survey || RAF || align=right data-sort-value="0.95" | 950 m || 
|-id=972 bgcolor=#E9E9E9
| 467972 ||  || — || December 24, 2005 || Kitt Peak || Spacewatch || — || align=right | 1.9 km || 
|-id=973 bgcolor=#E9E9E9
| 467973 ||  || — || February 25, 2012 || Mount Lemmon || Mount Lemmon Survey || — || align=right | 1.6 km || 
|-id=974 bgcolor=#E9E9E9
| 467974 ||  || — || July 25, 2008 || Mount Lemmon || Mount Lemmon Survey || — || align=right | 2.7 km || 
|-id=975 bgcolor=#E9E9E9
| 467975 ||  || — || February 6, 2010 || WISE || WISE || — || align=right | 3.1 km || 
|-id=976 bgcolor=#d6d6d6
| 467976 ||  || — || June 8, 2012 || Mount Lemmon || Mount Lemmon Survey || — || align=right | 3.3 km || 
|-id=977 bgcolor=#E9E9E9
| 467977 ||  || — || May 14, 2012 || Mount Lemmon || Mount Lemmon Survey || — || align=right | 1.1 km || 
|-id=978 bgcolor=#d6d6d6
| 467978 ||  || — || April 26, 2011 || Mount Lemmon || Mount Lemmon Survey || — || align=right | 1.9 km || 
|-id=979 bgcolor=#d6d6d6
| 467979 ||  || — || July 18, 2007 || Mount Lemmon || Mount Lemmon Survey || — || align=right | 2.8 km || 
|-id=980 bgcolor=#E9E9E9
| 467980 ||  || — || September 18, 1995 || Kitt Peak || Spacewatch || ADE || align=right | 1.5 km || 
|-id=981 bgcolor=#d6d6d6
| 467981 ||  || — || December 31, 2008 || Kitt Peak || Spacewatch || — || align=right | 3.5 km || 
|-id=982 bgcolor=#d6d6d6
| 467982 ||  || — || January 2, 2009 || Kitt Peak || Spacewatch || — || align=right | 3.0 km || 
|-id=983 bgcolor=#E9E9E9
| 467983 ||  || — || April 27, 2007 || Kitt Peak || Spacewatch || — || align=right | 1.7 km || 
|-id=984 bgcolor=#FA8072
| 467984 ||  || — || March 14, 2007 || Mount Lemmon || Mount Lemmon Survey || — || align=right | 1.6 km || 
|-id=985 bgcolor=#d6d6d6
| 467985 ||  || — || October 31, 2007 || Kitt Peak || Spacewatch || EMA || align=right | 2.7 km || 
|-id=986 bgcolor=#d6d6d6
| 467986 ||  || — || April 7, 2005 || Kitt Peak || Spacewatch || — || align=right | 2.8 km || 
|-id=987 bgcolor=#d6d6d6
| 467987 ||  || — || September 16, 2012 || Mount Lemmon || Mount Lemmon Survey || — || align=right | 2.8 km || 
|-id=988 bgcolor=#d6d6d6
| 467988 ||  || — || September 15, 2012 || Mount Lemmon || Mount Lemmon Survey || THM || align=right | 2.1 km || 
|-id=989 bgcolor=#d6d6d6
| 467989 ||  || — || September 18, 2007 || Mount Lemmon || Mount Lemmon Survey || — || align=right | 3.4 km || 
|-id=990 bgcolor=#d6d6d6
| 467990 ||  || — || September 19, 2001 || Socorro || LINEAR || — || align=right | 2.7 km || 
|-id=991 bgcolor=#d6d6d6
| 467991 ||  || — || June 11, 2005 || Kitt Peak || Spacewatch || — || align=right | 2.9 km || 
|-id=992 bgcolor=#d6d6d6
| 467992 ||  || — || October 20, 2001 || Socorro || LINEAR || — || align=right | 2.4 km || 
|-id=993 bgcolor=#d6d6d6
| 467993 ||  || — || November 17, 2001 || Kitt Peak || Spacewatch || — || align=right | 2.7 km || 
|-id=994 bgcolor=#d6d6d6
| 467994 ||  || — || January 24, 2010 || WISE || WISE || — || align=right | 4.0 km || 
|-id=995 bgcolor=#fefefe
| 467995 ||  || — || April 7, 2006 || Catalina || CSS || H || align=right data-sort-value="0.71" | 710 m || 
|-id=996 bgcolor=#d6d6d6
| 467996 ||  || — || April 3, 2010 || Kitt Peak || Spacewatch || — || align=right | 2.8 km || 
|-id=997 bgcolor=#d6d6d6
| 467997 ||  || — || November 3, 2007 || Kitt Peak || Spacewatch || — || align=right | 2.7 km || 
|-id=998 bgcolor=#d6d6d6
| 467998 ||  || — || October 8, 2012 || Mount Lemmon || Mount Lemmon Survey || — || align=right | 2.9 km || 
|-id=999 bgcolor=#d6d6d6
| 467999 ||  || — || October 28, 2006 || Mount Lemmon || Mount Lemmon Survey || 7:4 || align=right | 3.4 km || 
|-id=000 bgcolor=#d6d6d6
| 468000 ||  || — || June 29, 2005 || Kitt Peak || Spacewatch || — || align=right | 3.7 km || 
|}

References

External links 
 Discovery Circumstances: Numbered Minor Planets (465001)–(470000) (IAU Minor Planet Center)

0467